

121001–121100 

|-bgcolor=#fefefe
| 121001 Liangshanxichang ||  ||  || December 22, 1998 || Xinglong || SCAP || FLO || align=right | 1.1 km || 
|-id=002 bgcolor=#fefefe
| 121002 ||  || — || December 22, 1998 || Kitt Peak || Spacewatch || FLO || align=right | 1.2 km || 
|-id=003 bgcolor=#fefefe
| 121003 ||  || — || December 25, 1998 || Kitt Peak || Spacewatch || EUT || align=right | 1.2 km || 
|-id=004 bgcolor=#fefefe
| 121004 ||  || — || December 29, 1998 || Ondřejov || L. Kotková || NYS || align=right | 1.2 km || 
|-id=005 bgcolor=#d6d6d6
| 121005 ||  || — || December 22, 1998 || Kitt Peak || Spacewatch || HIL3:2 || align=right | 10 km || 
|-id=006 bgcolor=#fefefe
| 121006 ||  || — || January 7, 1999 || Kitt Peak || Spacewatch || — || align=right | 2.4 km || 
|-id=007 bgcolor=#FA8072
| 121007 Jiaxingnanhu ||  ||  || January 10, 1999 || Xinglong || SCAP || — || align=right | 1.4 km || 
|-id=008 bgcolor=#fefefe
| 121008 Michellecrigger ||  ||  || January 14, 1999 || Catalina || CSS || — || align=right | 2.1 km || 
|-id=009 bgcolor=#d6d6d6
| 121009 ||  || — || January 7, 1999 || Kitt Peak || Spacewatch || — || align=right | 6.2 km || 
|-id=010 bgcolor=#fefefe
| 121010 ||  || — || January 11, 1999 || Kitt Peak || Spacewatch || — || align=right | 1.3 km || 
|-id=011 bgcolor=#fefefe
| 121011 ||  || — || January 13, 1999 || Kitt Peak || Spacewatch || — || align=right | 2.4 km || 
|-id=012 bgcolor=#fefefe
| 121012 ||  || — || January 13, 1999 || Kitt Peak || Spacewatch || — || align=right | 1.3 km || 
|-id=013 bgcolor=#fefefe
| 121013 ||  || — || January 13, 1999 || Višnjan Observatory || K. Korlević || — || align=right | 1.7 km || 
|-id=014 bgcolor=#fefefe
| 121014 ||  || — || January 13, 1999 || Xinglong || SCAP || — || align=right | 1.7 km || 
|-id=015 bgcolor=#fefefe
| 121015 ||  || — || January 10, 1999 || Kitt Peak || Spacewatch || NYS || align=right | 1.1 km || 
|-id=016 bgcolor=#fefefe
| 121016 Christopharnold ||  ||  || January 18, 1999 || Drebach || J. Kandler || PHO || align=right | 2.2 km || 
|-id=017 bgcolor=#fefefe
| 121017 ||  || — || January 19, 1999 || San Marcello || A. Boattini, M. Tombelli || — || align=right | 3.8 km || 
|-id=018 bgcolor=#fefefe
| 121018 ||  || — || January 20, 1999 || Caussols || ODAS || — || align=right | 3.7 km || 
|-id=019 bgcolor=#fefefe
| 121019 Minodamato ||  ||  || January 20, 1999 || Campo Catino || F. Mallia, M. Di Sora || — || align=right | 1.6 km || 
|-id=020 bgcolor=#fefefe
| 121020 ||  || — || January 22, 1999 || Višnjan Observatory || K. Korlević || — || align=right | 1.6 km || 
|-id=021 bgcolor=#fefefe
| 121021 ||  || — || January 24, 1999 || Višnjan Observatory || K. Korlević || NYS || align=right | 1.4 km || 
|-id=022 bgcolor=#fefefe
| 121022 Galliano ||  ||  || January 20, 1999 || Caussols || ODAS || NYS || align=right | 1.1 km || 
|-id=023 bgcolor=#fefefe
| 121023 ||  || — || January 18, 1999 || Socorro || LINEAR || — || align=right | 2.2 km || 
|-id=024 bgcolor=#fefefe
| 121024 ||  || — || January 16, 1999 || Kitt Peak || Spacewatch || — || align=right data-sort-value="0.98" | 980 m || 
|-id=025 bgcolor=#fefefe
| 121025 ||  || — || January 16, 1999 || Kitt Peak || Spacewatch || — || align=right | 1.1 km || 
|-id=026 bgcolor=#fefefe
| 121026 ||  || — || January 16, 1999 || Kitt Peak || Spacewatch || NYS || align=right | 1.1 km || 
|-id=027 bgcolor=#fefefe
| 121027 ||  || — || January 17, 1999 || Kitt Peak || Spacewatch || V || align=right data-sort-value="0.99" | 990 m || 
|-id=028 bgcolor=#fefefe
| 121028 ||  || — || January 18, 1999 || Kitt Peak || Spacewatch || V || align=right | 1.6 km || 
|-id=029 bgcolor=#fefefe
| 121029 ||  || — || January 18, 1999 || Kitt Peak || Spacewatch || — || align=right | 1.4 km || 
|-id=030 bgcolor=#fefefe
| 121030 ||  || — || January 18, 1999 || Kitt Peak || Spacewatch || NYS || align=right | 1.1 km || 
|-id=031 bgcolor=#fefefe
| 121031 ||  || — || January 19, 1999 || Kitt Peak || Spacewatch || — || align=right | 1.2 km || 
|-id=032 bgcolor=#FA8072
| 121032 Wadesisler ||  ||  || January 23, 1999 || Catalina || CSS || — || align=right | 1.3 km || 
|-id=033 bgcolor=#fefefe
| 121033 || 1999 CU || — || February 5, 1999 || Oizumi || T. Kobayashi || NYS || align=right | 1.2 km || 
|-id=034 bgcolor=#fefefe
| 121034 ||  || — || February 6, 1999 || Oizumi || T. Kobayashi || — || align=right | 1.9 km || 
|-id=035 bgcolor=#fefefe
| 121035 ||  || — || February 10, 1999 || Socorro || LINEAR || PHO || align=right | 2.9 km || 
|-id=036 bgcolor=#fefefe
| 121036 ||  || — || February 10, 1999 || Socorro || LINEAR || PHO || align=right | 2.9 km || 
|-id=037 bgcolor=#fefefe
| 121037 ||  || — || February 10, 1999 || Socorro || LINEAR || — || align=right | 2.4 km || 
|-id=038 bgcolor=#fefefe
| 121038 ||  || — || February 12, 1999 || Socorro || LINEAR || — || align=right | 3.8 km || 
|-id=039 bgcolor=#fefefe
| 121039 ||  || — || February 12, 1999 || Socorro || LINEAR || PHO || align=right | 2.2 km || 
|-id=040 bgcolor=#fefefe
| 121040 ||  || — || February 14, 1999 || Caussols || ODAS || V || align=right | 1.2 km || 
|-id=041 bgcolor=#fefefe
| 121041 ||  || — || February 11, 1999 || Socorro || LINEAR || — || align=right | 4.3 km || 
|-id=042 bgcolor=#fefefe
| 121042 ||  || — || February 11, 1999 || Socorro || LINEAR || PHO || align=right | 3.5 km || 
|-id=043 bgcolor=#fefefe
| 121043 ||  || — || February 10, 1999 || Socorro || LINEAR || — || align=right | 1.4 km || 
|-id=044 bgcolor=#fefefe
| 121044 ||  || — || February 10, 1999 || Socorro || LINEAR || — || align=right | 1.2 km || 
|-id=045 bgcolor=#d6d6d6
| 121045 ||  || — || February 10, 1999 || Socorro || LINEAR || HIL3:2 || align=right | 9.5 km || 
|-id=046 bgcolor=#E9E9E9
| 121046 ||  || — || February 10, 1999 || Socorro || LINEAR || — || align=right | 1.8 km || 
|-id=047 bgcolor=#fefefe
| 121047 ||  || — || February 10, 1999 || Socorro || LINEAR || — || align=right | 2.5 km || 
|-id=048 bgcolor=#fefefe
| 121048 ||  || — || February 10, 1999 || Socorro || LINEAR || FLO || align=right | 2.6 km || 
|-id=049 bgcolor=#fefefe
| 121049 ||  || — || February 10, 1999 || Socorro || LINEAR || — || align=right | 1.3 km || 
|-id=050 bgcolor=#fefefe
| 121050 ||  || — || February 10, 1999 || Socorro || LINEAR || — || align=right | 2.1 km || 
|-id=051 bgcolor=#fefefe
| 121051 ||  || — || February 10, 1999 || Socorro || LINEAR || — || align=right | 1.9 km || 
|-id=052 bgcolor=#fefefe
| 121052 ||  || — || February 10, 1999 || Socorro || LINEAR || NYS || align=right | 2.0 km || 
|-id=053 bgcolor=#fefefe
| 121053 ||  || — || February 10, 1999 || Socorro || LINEAR || NYS || align=right | 1.2 km || 
|-id=054 bgcolor=#fefefe
| 121054 ||  || — || February 12, 1999 || Socorro || LINEAR || — || align=right | 1.5 km || 
|-id=055 bgcolor=#fefefe
| 121055 ||  || — || February 12, 1999 || Socorro || LINEAR || — || align=right | 1.9 km || 
|-id=056 bgcolor=#fefefe
| 121056 ||  || — || February 12, 1999 || Socorro || LINEAR || — || align=right | 2.6 km || 
|-id=057 bgcolor=#fefefe
| 121057 ||  || — || February 10, 1999 || Socorro || LINEAR || NYS || align=right data-sort-value="0.98" | 980 m || 
|-id=058 bgcolor=#fefefe
| 121058 ||  || — || February 10, 1999 || Socorro || LINEAR || — || align=right | 1.4 km || 
|-id=059 bgcolor=#fefefe
| 121059 ||  || — || February 10, 1999 || Socorro || LINEAR || EUT || align=right | 1.1 km || 
|-id=060 bgcolor=#fefefe
| 121060 ||  || — || February 12, 1999 || Socorro || LINEAR || — || align=right | 1.4 km || 
|-id=061 bgcolor=#fefefe
| 121061 ||  || — || February 12, 1999 || Socorro || LINEAR || NYS || align=right | 1.3 km || 
|-id=062 bgcolor=#fefefe
| 121062 ||  || — || February 12, 1999 || Socorro || LINEAR || NYS || align=right | 1.3 km || 
|-id=063 bgcolor=#fefefe
| 121063 ||  || — || February 11, 1999 || Socorro || LINEAR || — || align=right | 4.4 km || 
|-id=064 bgcolor=#fefefe
| 121064 ||  || — || February 9, 1999 || Kitt Peak || Spacewatch || — || align=right | 1.3 km || 
|-id=065 bgcolor=#fefefe
| 121065 ||  || — || February 9, 1999 || Kitt Peak || Spacewatch || — || align=right | 2.3 km || 
|-id=066 bgcolor=#E9E9E9
| 121066 ||  || — || February 8, 1999 || Kitt Peak || Spacewatch || — || align=right | 3.6 km || 
|-id=067 bgcolor=#fefefe
| 121067 ||  || — || February 8, 1999 || Kitt Peak || Spacewatch || MAS || align=right data-sort-value="0.96" | 960 m || 
|-id=068 bgcolor=#d6d6d6
| 121068 ||  || — || February 10, 1999 || Kitt Peak || Spacewatch || THM || align=right | 4.4 km || 
|-id=069 bgcolor=#fefefe
| 121069 ||  || — || February 13, 1999 || Kitt Peak || Spacewatch || NYS || align=right | 1.1 km || 
|-id=070 bgcolor=#fefefe
| 121070 ||  || — || February 13, 1999 || Kitt Peak || Spacewatch || — || align=right | 3.6 km || 
|-id=071 bgcolor=#fefefe
| 121071 ||  || — || February 13, 1999 || Kitt Peak || Spacewatch || — || align=right | 1.8 km || 
|-id=072 bgcolor=#fefefe
| 121072 ||  || — || February 17, 1999 || Farpoint || G. Hug, G. Bell || NYS || align=right | 3.2 km || 
|-id=073 bgcolor=#fefefe
| 121073 ||  || — || March 15, 1999 || Socorro || LINEAR || — || align=right | 2.2 km || 
|-id=074 bgcolor=#d6d6d6
| 121074 ||  || — || March 16, 1999 || Kitt Peak || Spacewatch || 3:2 || align=right | 7.7 km || 
|-id=075 bgcolor=#fefefe
| 121075 ||  || — || March 17, 1999 || Kitt Peak || Spacewatch || NYS || align=right | 1.4 km || 
|-id=076 bgcolor=#fefefe
| 121076 ||  || — || March 17, 1999 || Kitt Peak || Spacewatch || MAS || align=right | 1.6 km || 
|-id=077 bgcolor=#fefefe
| 121077 ||  || — || March 17, 1999 || Kitt Peak || Spacewatch || NYS || align=right | 1.5 km || 
|-id=078 bgcolor=#fefefe
| 121078 ||  || — || March 19, 1999 || Socorro || LINEAR || PHO || align=right | 1.8 km || 
|-id=079 bgcolor=#fefefe
| 121079 ||  || — || March 17, 1999 || Kitt Peak || Spacewatch || — || align=right | 1.8 km || 
|-id=080 bgcolor=#fefefe
| 121080 ||  || — || March 17, 1999 || Caussols || ODAS || ERI || align=right | 3.1 km || 
|-id=081 bgcolor=#fefefe
| 121081 ||  || — || March 20, 1999 || Socorro || LINEAR || PHO || align=right | 2.6 km || 
|-id=082 bgcolor=#fefefe
| 121082 ||  || — || March 19, 1999 || Kitt Peak || Spacewatch || NYS || align=right | 1.1 km || 
|-id=083 bgcolor=#fefefe
| 121083 ||  || — || March 23, 1999 || Kitt Peak || Spacewatch || MAS || align=right data-sort-value="0.96" | 960 m || 
|-id=084 bgcolor=#E9E9E9
| 121084 ||  || — || March 23, 1999 || Kitt Peak || Spacewatch || — || align=right | 2.2 km || 
|-id=085 bgcolor=#fefefe
| 121085 ||  || — || March 23, 1999 || Kitt Peak || Spacewatch || — || align=right | 1.3 km || 
|-id=086 bgcolor=#fefefe
| 121086 ||  || — || March 23, 1999 || Kitt Peak || Spacewatch || NYS || align=right | 1.5 km || 
|-id=087 bgcolor=#fefefe
| 121087 ||  || — || March 22, 1999 || Anderson Mesa || LONEOS || — || align=right | 1.9 km || 
|-id=088 bgcolor=#fefefe
| 121088 ||  || — || March 24, 1999 || Kleť || Kleť Obs. || NYS || align=right | 1.4 km || 
|-id=089 bgcolor=#fefefe
| 121089 Vyšší Brod ||  ||  || March 24, 1999 || Kleť || M. Tichý || — || align=right | 2.1 km || 
|-id=090 bgcolor=#fefefe
| 121090 ||  || — || March 19, 1999 || Socorro || LINEAR || NYS || align=right | 1.6 km || 
|-id=091 bgcolor=#fefefe
| 121091 ||  || — || March 19, 1999 || Socorro || LINEAR || NYS || align=right | 1.9 km || 
|-id=092 bgcolor=#fefefe
| 121092 ||  || — || March 20, 1999 || Socorro || LINEAR || — || align=right | 1.9 km || 
|-id=093 bgcolor=#fefefe
| 121093 ||  || — || March 20, 1999 || Socorro || LINEAR || NYS || align=right | 1.7 km || 
|-id=094 bgcolor=#fefefe
| 121094 ||  || — || March 20, 1999 || Socorro || LINEAR || — || align=right | 2.1 km || 
|-id=095 bgcolor=#fefefe
| 121095 ||  || — || March 20, 1999 || Socorro || LINEAR || NYS || align=right | 3.3 km || 
|-id=096 bgcolor=#fefefe
| 121096 ||  || — || March 20, 1999 || Socorro || LINEAR || ERI || align=right | 4.0 km || 
|-id=097 bgcolor=#fefefe
| 121097 ||  || — || March 20, 1999 || Socorro || LINEAR || V || align=right | 1.2 km || 
|-id=098 bgcolor=#fefefe
| 121098 ||  || — || March 20, 1999 || Socorro || LINEAR || FLO || align=right | 1.7 km || 
|-id=099 bgcolor=#fefefe
| 121099 ||  || — || March 20, 1999 || Socorro || LINEAR || NYS || align=right | 3.4 km || 
|-id=100 bgcolor=#fefefe
| 121100 ||  || — || March 22, 1999 || Anderson Mesa || LONEOS || — || align=right | 1.6 km || 
|}

121101–121200 

|-bgcolor=#fefefe
| 121101 ||  || — || March 22, 1999 || Anderson Mesa || LONEOS || NYS || align=right | 2.9 km || 
|-id=102 bgcolor=#fefefe
| 121102 ||  || — || March 20, 1999 || Anderson Mesa || LONEOS || — || align=right | 1.6 km || 
|-id=103 bgcolor=#E9E9E9
| 121103 Ericneilsen ||  ||  || March 20, 1999 || Apache Point || SDSS || — || align=right | 3.5 km || 
|-id=104 bgcolor=#fefefe
| 121104 || 1999 GQ || — || April 5, 1999 || Višnjan Observatory || K. Korlević || ERI || align=right | 2.9 km || 
|-id=105 bgcolor=#E9E9E9
| 121105 ||  || — || April 7, 1999 || Oizumi || T. Kobayashi || — || align=right | 4.5 km || 
|-id=106 bgcolor=#fefefe
| 121106 ||  || — || April 6, 1999 || Kitt Peak || Spacewatch || NYS || align=right | 1.2 km || 
|-id=107 bgcolor=#fefefe
| 121107 ||  || — || April 3, 1999 || Xinglong || SCAP || PHO || align=right | 5.2 km || 
|-id=108 bgcolor=#fefefe
| 121108 ||  || — || April 15, 1999 || Socorro || LINEAR || — || align=right | 5.2 km || 
|-id=109 bgcolor=#fefefe
| 121109 ||  || — || April 9, 1999 || Anderson Mesa || LONEOS || — || align=right | 1.5 km || 
|-id=110 bgcolor=#fefefe
| 121110 ||  || — || April 12, 1999 || Kitt Peak || Spacewatch || — || align=right | 1.8 km || 
|-id=111 bgcolor=#fefefe
| 121111 ||  || — || April 9, 1999 || Socorro || LINEAR || FLO || align=right | 1.3 km || 
|-id=112 bgcolor=#fefefe
| 121112 ||  || — || April 6, 1999 || Socorro || LINEAR || NYS || align=right | 1.6 km || 
|-id=113 bgcolor=#E9E9E9
| 121113 ||  || — || April 6, 1999 || Socorro || LINEAR || EUN || align=right | 2.5 km || 
|-id=114 bgcolor=#fefefe
| 121114 ||  || — || April 7, 1999 || Socorro || LINEAR || — || align=right | 2.3 km || 
|-id=115 bgcolor=#fefefe
| 121115 ||  || — || April 7, 1999 || Socorro || LINEAR || NYS || align=right | 1.2 km || 
|-id=116 bgcolor=#fefefe
| 121116 ||  || — || April 12, 1999 || Socorro || LINEAR || — || align=right | 1.6 km || 
|-id=117 bgcolor=#fefefe
| 121117 ||  || — || April 9, 1999 || Kitt Peak || Spacewatch || SUL || align=right | 3.7 km || 
|-id=118 bgcolor=#fefefe
| 121118 ||  || — || April 7, 1999 || Socorro || LINEAR || — || align=right | 1.7 km || 
|-id=119 bgcolor=#fefefe
| 121119 ||  || — || April 12, 1999 || Socorro || LINEAR || — || align=right | 1.9 km || 
|-id=120 bgcolor=#fefefe
| 121120 ||  || — || April 12, 1999 || Socorro || LINEAR || — || align=right | 3.4 km || 
|-id=121 bgcolor=#fefefe
| 121121 Koyoharugotoge ||  ||  || April 19, 1999 || Goodricke-Pigott || R. A. Tucker || H || align=right data-sort-value="0.88" | 880 m || 
|-id=122 bgcolor=#fefefe
| 121122 ||  || — || April 21, 1999 || Woomera || F. B. Zoltowski || — || align=right | 1.4 km || 
|-id=123 bgcolor=#E9E9E9
| 121123 ||  || — || April 16, 1999 || Kitt Peak || Spacewatch || AST || align=right | 3.0 km || 
|-id=124 bgcolor=#fefefe
| 121124 ||  || — || April 17, 1999 || Socorro || LINEAR || NYS || align=right | 1.3 km || 
|-id=125 bgcolor=#fefefe
| 121125 ||  || — || April 17, 1999 || Socorro || LINEAR || NYS || align=right | 1.5 km || 
|-id=126 bgcolor=#fefefe
| 121126 ||  || — || May 8, 1999 || Catalina || CSS || — || align=right | 1.6 km || 
|-id=127 bgcolor=#fefefe
| 121127 ||  || — || May 8, 1999 || Reedy Creek || J. Broughton || NYS || align=right | 1.7 km || 
|-id=128 bgcolor=#fefefe
| 121128 ||  || — || May 6, 1999 || Socorro || LINEAR || KLI || align=right | 3.4 km || 
|-id=129 bgcolor=#fefefe
| 121129 ||  || — || May 10, 1999 || Socorro || LINEAR || PHO || align=right | 2.5 km || 
|-id=130 bgcolor=#fefefe
| 121130 ||  || — || May 10, 1999 || Socorro || LINEAR || V || align=right | 1.4 km || 
|-id=131 bgcolor=#fefefe
| 121131 ||  || — || May 7, 1999 || Catalina || CSS || CHL || align=right | 3.1 km || 
|-id=132 bgcolor=#fefefe
| 121132 Garydavis ||  ||  || May 8, 1999 || Catalina || CSS || — || align=right | 1.9 km || 
|-id=133 bgcolor=#fefefe
| 121133 Kenflurchick ||  ||  || May 15, 1999 || Goodricke-Pigott || R. A. Tucker || — || align=right | 2.8 km || 
|-id=134 bgcolor=#E9E9E9
| 121134 ||  || — || May 15, 1999 || Kitt Peak || Spacewatch || — || align=right | 2.2 km || 
|-id=135 bgcolor=#E9E9E9
| 121135 ||  || — || May 10, 1999 || Socorro || LINEAR || — || align=right | 2.3 km || 
|-id=136 bgcolor=#fefefe
| 121136 ||  || — || May 10, 1999 || Socorro || LINEAR || FLO || align=right | 1.6 km || 
|-id=137 bgcolor=#fefefe
| 121137 ||  || — || May 10, 1999 || Socorro || LINEAR || NYS || align=right | 1.4 km || 
|-id=138 bgcolor=#fefefe
| 121138 ||  || — || May 10, 1999 || Socorro || LINEAR || NYS || align=right | 1.3 km || 
|-id=139 bgcolor=#fefefe
| 121139 ||  || — || May 10, 1999 || Socorro || LINEAR || ERI || align=right | 3.4 km || 
|-id=140 bgcolor=#fefefe
| 121140 ||  || — || May 10, 1999 || Socorro || LINEAR || NYS || align=right | 1.3 km || 
|-id=141 bgcolor=#E9E9E9
| 121141 ||  || — || May 10, 1999 || Socorro || LINEAR || — || align=right | 2.3 km || 
|-id=142 bgcolor=#fefefe
| 121142 ||  || — || May 10, 1999 || Socorro || LINEAR || MAS || align=right | 1.5 km || 
|-id=143 bgcolor=#fefefe
| 121143 ||  || — || May 10, 1999 || Socorro || LINEAR || V || align=right | 1.2 km || 
|-id=144 bgcolor=#fefefe
| 121144 ||  || — || May 10, 1999 || Socorro || LINEAR || NYS || align=right | 1.2 km || 
|-id=145 bgcolor=#fefefe
| 121145 ||  || — || May 10, 1999 || Socorro || LINEAR || — || align=right | 2.5 km || 
|-id=146 bgcolor=#fefefe
| 121146 ||  || — || May 12, 1999 || Socorro || LINEAR || — || align=right | 3.3 km || 
|-id=147 bgcolor=#fefefe
| 121147 ||  || — || May 12, 1999 || Socorro || LINEAR || — || align=right | 2.2 km || 
|-id=148 bgcolor=#fefefe
| 121148 ||  || — || May 12, 1999 || Socorro || LINEAR || V || align=right | 1.8 km || 
|-id=149 bgcolor=#fefefe
| 121149 ||  || — || May 12, 1999 || Socorro || LINEAR || NYS || align=right | 1.5 km || 
|-id=150 bgcolor=#fefefe
| 121150 ||  || — || May 12, 1999 || Socorro || LINEAR || — || align=right | 2.0 km || 
|-id=151 bgcolor=#fefefe
| 121151 ||  || — || May 12, 1999 || Socorro || LINEAR || V || align=right | 1.4 km || 
|-id=152 bgcolor=#fefefe
| 121152 ||  || — || May 12, 1999 || Socorro || LINEAR || — || align=right | 2.9 km || 
|-id=153 bgcolor=#fefefe
| 121153 ||  || — || May 14, 1999 || Socorro || LINEAR || — || align=right | 1.6 km || 
|-id=154 bgcolor=#fefefe
| 121154 ||  || — || May 12, 1999 || Socorro || LINEAR || — || align=right | 1.8 km || 
|-id=155 bgcolor=#E9E9E9
| 121155 ||  || — || May 12, 1999 || Socorro || LINEAR || — || align=right | 3.3 km || 
|-id=156 bgcolor=#fefefe
| 121156 ||  || — || May 12, 1999 || Socorro || LINEAR || — || align=right | 3.0 km || 
|-id=157 bgcolor=#fefefe
| 121157 ||  || — || May 12, 1999 || Socorro || LINEAR || — || align=right | 2.5 km || 
|-id=158 bgcolor=#E9E9E9
| 121158 ||  || — || May 12, 1999 || Socorro || LINEAR || — || align=right | 4.5 km || 
|-id=159 bgcolor=#E9E9E9
| 121159 ||  || — || May 12, 1999 || Socorro || LINEAR || — || align=right | 5.8 km || 
|-id=160 bgcolor=#fefefe
| 121160 ||  || — || May 13, 1999 || Socorro || LINEAR || — || align=right | 1.6 km || 
|-id=161 bgcolor=#fefefe
| 121161 ||  || — || May 13, 1999 || Socorro || LINEAR || — || align=right | 1.4 km || 
|-id=162 bgcolor=#E9E9E9
| 121162 ||  || — || May 13, 1999 || Socorro || LINEAR || DOR || align=right | 6.5 km || 
|-id=163 bgcolor=#fefefe
| 121163 ||  || — || May 13, 1999 || Socorro || LINEAR || MAS || align=right | 1.8 km || 
|-id=164 bgcolor=#fefefe
| 121164 ||  || — || May 13, 1999 || Socorro || LINEAR || — || align=right | 1.8 km || 
|-id=165 bgcolor=#fefefe
| 121165 ||  || — || May 13, 1999 || Socorro || LINEAR || NYS || align=right | 1.6 km || 
|-id=166 bgcolor=#fefefe
| 121166 ||  || — || May 10, 1999 || Socorro || LINEAR || NYS || align=right | 1.7 km || 
|-id=167 bgcolor=#fefefe
| 121167 ||  || — || May 12, 1999 || Socorro || LINEAR || — || align=right | 2.3 km || 
|-id=168 bgcolor=#fefefe
| 121168 ||  || — || May 16, 1999 || Kitt Peak || Spacewatch || MAS || align=right | 1.5 km || 
|-id=169 bgcolor=#fefefe
| 121169 ||  || — || May 16, 1999 || Kitt Peak || Spacewatch || NYS || align=right | 1.3 km || 
|-id=170 bgcolor=#fefefe
| 121170 ||  || — || May 17, 1999 || Socorro || LINEAR || — || align=right | 1.8 km || 
|-id=171 bgcolor=#fefefe
| 121171 ||  || — || May 18, 1999 || Socorro || LINEAR || NYS || align=right | 1.5 km || 
|-id=172 bgcolor=#E9E9E9
| 121172 ||  || — || May 18, 1999 || Socorro || LINEAR || — || align=right | 2.2 km || 
|-id=173 bgcolor=#E9E9E9
| 121173 ||  || — || May 18, 1999 || Socorro || LINEAR || EUN || align=right | 2.3 km || 
|-id=174 bgcolor=#fefefe
| 121174 ||  || — || May 18, 1999 || Socorro || LINEAR || — || align=right | 1.9 km || 
|-id=175 bgcolor=#fefefe
| 121175 ||  || — || May 18, 1999 || Socorro || LINEAR || — || align=right | 2.0 km || 
|-id=176 bgcolor=#fefefe
| 121176 ||  || — || June 11, 1999 || Socorro || LINEAR || PHO || align=right | 1.7 km || 
|-id=177 bgcolor=#fefefe
| 121177 ||  || — || June 7, 1999 || Kitt Peak || Spacewatch || — || align=right | 6.5 km || 
|-id=178 bgcolor=#fefefe
| 121178 ||  || — || June 8, 1999 || Socorro || LINEAR || — || align=right | 1.7 km || 
|-id=179 bgcolor=#E9E9E9
| 121179 ||  || — || June 10, 1999 || Socorro || LINEAR || — || align=right | 1.7 km || 
|-id=180 bgcolor=#fefefe
| 121180 ||  || — || June 12, 1999 || Socorro || LINEAR || H || align=right | 1.2 km || 
|-id=181 bgcolor=#fefefe
| 121181 ||  || — || June 9, 1999 || Socorro || LINEAR || — || align=right | 1.6 km || 
|-id=182 bgcolor=#E9E9E9
| 121182 ||  || — || June 11, 1999 || Kitt Peak || Spacewatch || — || align=right | 1.5 km || 
|-id=183 bgcolor=#fefefe
| 121183 ||  || — || June 7, 1999 || Anderson Mesa || LONEOS || — || align=right | 3.1 km || 
|-id=184 bgcolor=#fefefe
| 121184 || 1999 NH || — || July 5, 1999 || Farpoint || G. Bell, G. Hug || H || align=right | 1.6 km || 
|-id=185 bgcolor=#fefefe
| 121185 || 1999 NP || — || July 7, 1999 || Reedy Creek || J. Broughton || NYS || align=right | 1.9 km || 
|-id=186 bgcolor=#fefefe
| 121186 ||  || — || July 12, 1999 || Socorro || LINEAR || H || align=right | 1.9 km || 
|-id=187 bgcolor=#E9E9E9
| 121187 ||  || — || July 14, 1999 || Socorro || LINEAR || — || align=right | 2.0 km || 
|-id=188 bgcolor=#d6d6d6
| 121188 ||  || — || July 14, 1999 || Socorro || LINEAR || — || align=right | 4.4 km || 
|-id=189 bgcolor=#fefefe
| 121189 ||  || — || July 14, 1999 || Socorro || LINEAR || — || align=right | 2.1 km || 
|-id=190 bgcolor=#fefefe
| 121190 ||  || — || July 14, 1999 || Socorro || LINEAR || H || align=right | 1.1 km || 
|-id=191 bgcolor=#E9E9E9
| 121191 ||  || — || July 14, 1999 || Socorro || LINEAR || — || align=right | 2.1 km || 
|-id=192 bgcolor=#E9E9E9
| 121192 ||  || — || July 14, 1999 || Socorro || LINEAR || — || align=right | 2.3 km || 
|-id=193 bgcolor=#fefefe
| 121193 ||  || — || July 14, 1999 || Socorro || LINEAR || — || align=right | 2.8 km || 
|-id=194 bgcolor=#E9E9E9
| 121194 ||  || — || July 14, 1999 || Socorro || LINEAR || — || align=right | 2.6 km || 
|-id=195 bgcolor=#E9E9E9
| 121195 ||  || — || July 14, 1999 || Socorro || LINEAR || — || align=right | 4.3 km || 
|-id=196 bgcolor=#E9E9E9
| 121196 ||  || — || July 14, 1999 || Socorro || LINEAR || — || align=right | 1.9 km || 
|-id=197 bgcolor=#fefefe
| 121197 ||  || — || July 14, 1999 || Socorro || LINEAR || H || align=right | 1.7 km || 
|-id=198 bgcolor=#E9E9E9
| 121198 ||  || — || July 14, 1999 || Socorro || LINEAR || — || align=right | 4.6 km || 
|-id=199 bgcolor=#E9E9E9
| 121199 ||  || — || July 14, 1999 || Socorro || LINEAR || — || align=right | 2.3 km || 
|-id=200 bgcolor=#E9E9E9
| 121200 ||  || — || July 14, 1999 || Socorro || LINEAR || — || align=right | 6.9 km || 
|}

121201–121300 

|-bgcolor=#fefefe
| 121201 ||  || — || July 14, 1999 || Socorro || LINEAR || H || align=right | 1.1 km || 
|-id=202 bgcolor=#E9E9E9
| 121202 ||  || — || July 13, 1999 || Socorro || LINEAR || — || align=right | 2.5 km || 
|-id=203 bgcolor=#E9E9E9
| 121203 ||  || — || July 13, 1999 || Socorro || LINEAR || — || align=right | 2.4 km || 
|-id=204 bgcolor=#fefefe
| 121204 ||  || — || July 22, 1999 || Socorro || LINEAR || H || align=right | 1.3 km || 
|-id=205 bgcolor=#d6d6d6
| 121205 ||  || — || August 8, 1999 || Prescott || P. G. Comba || — || align=right | 4.1 km || 
|-id=206 bgcolor=#E9E9E9
| 121206 ||  || — || August 13, 1999 || Baton Rouge || W. R. Cooney Jr. || — || align=right | 4.6 km || 
|-id=207 bgcolor=#fefefe
| 121207 ||  || — || August 7, 1999 || Anderson Mesa || LONEOS || H || align=right | 1.0 km || 
|-id=208 bgcolor=#E9E9E9
| 121208 ||  || — || August 8, 1999 || Gekko || T. Kagawa || — || align=right | 2.4 km || 
|-id=209 bgcolor=#d6d6d6
| 121209 ||  || — || August 17, 1999 || Kitt Peak || Spacewatch || EOS || align=right | 3.9 km || 
|-id=210 bgcolor=#FA8072
| 121210 ||  || — || August 25, 1999 || Ondřejov || L. Kotková || — || align=right | 1.9 km || 
|-id=211 bgcolor=#E9E9E9
| 121211 Nikeshadavis ||  ||  || September 4, 1999 || Catalina || CSS || — || align=right | 1.9 km || 
|-id=212 bgcolor=#d6d6d6
| 121212 ||  || — || September 3, 1999 || Kitt Peak || Spacewatch || KOR || align=right | 1.9 km || 
|-id=213 bgcolor=#d6d6d6
| 121213 ||  || — || September 3, 1999 || Kitt Peak || Spacewatch || — || align=right | 4.4 km || 
|-id=214 bgcolor=#d6d6d6
| 121214 ||  || — || September 3, 1999 || Kitt Peak || Spacewatch || — || align=right | 3.5 km || 
|-id=215 bgcolor=#E9E9E9
| 121215 ||  || — || September 3, 1999 || Kitt Peak || Spacewatch || — || align=right | 3.0 km || 
|-id=216 bgcolor=#E9E9E9
| 121216 ||  || — || September 4, 1999 || Kitt Peak || Spacewatch || — || align=right | 4.4 km || 
|-id=217 bgcolor=#d6d6d6
| 121217 ||  || — || September 7, 1999 || Socorro || LINEAR || — || align=right | 6.4 km || 
|-id=218 bgcolor=#fefefe
| 121218 ||  || — || September 7, 1999 || Socorro || LINEAR || H || align=right | 1.3 km || 
|-id=219 bgcolor=#E9E9E9
| 121219 ||  || — || September 7, 1999 || Socorro || LINEAR || ADE || align=right | 4.8 km || 
|-id=220 bgcolor=#E9E9E9
| 121220 ||  || — || September 7, 1999 || Socorro || LINEAR || — || align=right | 1.9 km || 
|-id=221 bgcolor=#d6d6d6
| 121221 ||  || — || September 7, 1999 || Socorro || LINEAR || — || align=right | 3.2 km || 
|-id=222 bgcolor=#fefefe
| 121222 ||  || — || September 7, 1999 || Socorro || LINEAR || H || align=right | 1.4 km || 
|-id=223 bgcolor=#FA8072
| 121223 ||  || — || September 7, 1999 || Socorro || LINEAR || H || align=right data-sort-value="0.92" | 920 m || 
|-id=224 bgcolor=#fefefe
| 121224 ||  || — || September 7, 1999 || Socorro || LINEAR || H || align=right | 1.0 km || 
|-id=225 bgcolor=#d6d6d6
| 121225 ||  || — || September 8, 1999 || Kleť || Kleť Obs. || — || align=right | 8.1 km || 
|-id=226 bgcolor=#fefefe
| 121226 ||  || — || September 7, 1999 || Socorro || LINEAR || H || align=right data-sort-value="0.92" | 920 m || 
|-id=227 bgcolor=#fefefe
| 121227 ||  || — || September 7, 1999 || Socorro || LINEAR || H || align=right | 1.9 km || 
|-id=228 bgcolor=#fefefe
| 121228 ||  || — || September 8, 1999 || Socorro || LINEAR || H || align=right | 1.5 km || 
|-id=229 bgcolor=#E9E9E9
| 121229 ||  || — || September 8, 1999 || Socorro || LINEAR || — || align=right | 5.6 km || 
|-id=230 bgcolor=#fefefe
| 121230 ||  || — || September 8, 1999 || Socorro || LINEAR || H || align=right | 1.5 km || 
|-id=231 bgcolor=#fefefe
| 121231 ||  || — || September 8, 1999 || Socorro || LINEAR || H || align=right | 1.5 km || 
|-id=232 bgcolor=#E9E9E9
| 121232 Zerin ||  ||  || September 11, 1999 || Starkenburg Observatory || Starkenburg Obs. || — || align=right | 3.1 km || 
|-id=233 bgcolor=#d6d6d6
| 121233 ||  || — || September 10, 1999 || Woomera || F. B. Zoltowski || — || align=right | 5.0 km || 
|-id=234 bgcolor=#E9E9E9
| 121234 ||  || — || September 11, 1999 || Socorro || LINEAR || BRU || align=right | 6.3 km || 
|-id=235 bgcolor=#E9E9E9
| 121235 ||  || — || September 13, 1999 || Kanab || E. E. Sheridan || — || align=right | 1.8 km || 
|-id=236 bgcolor=#fefefe
| 121236 Adrianagutierrez ||  ||  || September 8, 1999 || Catalina || CSS || H || align=right | 1.3 km || 
|-id=237 bgcolor=#d6d6d6
| 121237 Zachdolch ||  ||  || September 8, 1999 || Catalina || CSS || — || align=right | 5.4 km || 
|-id=238 bgcolor=#fefefe
| 121238 ||  || — || September 7, 1999 || Socorro || LINEAR || H || align=right data-sort-value="0.85" | 850 m || 
|-id=239 bgcolor=#d6d6d6
| 121239 ||  || — || September 14, 1999 || Kleť || Kleť Obs. || KOR || align=right | 2.7 km || 
|-id=240 bgcolor=#d6d6d6
| 121240 ||  || — || September 15, 1999 || Reedy Creek || J. Broughton || — || align=right | 3.9 km || 
|-id=241 bgcolor=#E9E9E9
| 121241 ||  || — || September 7, 1999 || Socorro || LINEAR || — || align=right | 3.3 km || 
|-id=242 bgcolor=#E9E9E9
| 121242 ||  || — || September 7, 1999 || Socorro || LINEAR || — || align=right | 2.3 km || 
|-id=243 bgcolor=#E9E9E9
| 121243 ||  || — || September 7, 1999 || Socorro || LINEAR || — || align=right | 2.2 km || 
|-id=244 bgcolor=#fefefe
| 121244 ||  || — || September 7, 1999 || Socorro || LINEAR || — || align=right | 1.9 km || 
|-id=245 bgcolor=#E9E9E9
| 121245 ||  || — || September 7, 1999 || Socorro || LINEAR || — || align=right | 2.3 km || 
|-id=246 bgcolor=#fefefe
| 121246 ||  || — || September 7, 1999 || Socorro || LINEAR || — || align=right | 2.6 km || 
|-id=247 bgcolor=#E9E9E9
| 121247 ||  || — || September 7, 1999 || Socorro || LINEAR || — || align=right | 3.8 km || 
|-id=248 bgcolor=#E9E9E9
| 121248 ||  || — || September 7, 1999 || Socorro || LINEAR || GEF || align=right | 1.9 km || 
|-id=249 bgcolor=#E9E9E9
| 121249 ||  || — || September 7, 1999 || Socorro || LINEAR || — || align=right | 3.2 km || 
|-id=250 bgcolor=#E9E9E9
| 121250 ||  || — || September 7, 1999 || Socorro || LINEAR || DOR || align=right | 4.4 km || 
|-id=251 bgcolor=#d6d6d6
| 121251 ||  || — || September 7, 1999 || Socorro || LINEAR || — || align=right | 4.9 km || 
|-id=252 bgcolor=#d6d6d6
| 121252 ||  || — || September 7, 1999 || Socorro || LINEAR || — || align=right | 5.6 km || 
|-id=253 bgcolor=#d6d6d6
| 121253 ||  || — || September 7, 1999 || Socorro || LINEAR || — || align=right | 7.1 km || 
|-id=254 bgcolor=#E9E9E9
| 121254 ||  || — || September 7, 1999 || Socorro || LINEAR || — || align=right | 2.0 km || 
|-id=255 bgcolor=#d6d6d6
| 121255 ||  || — || September 7, 1999 || Socorro || LINEAR || EOS || align=right | 7.9 km || 
|-id=256 bgcolor=#E9E9E9
| 121256 ||  || — || September 7, 1999 || Socorro || LINEAR || — || align=right | 2.5 km || 
|-id=257 bgcolor=#E9E9E9
| 121257 ||  || — || September 7, 1999 || Socorro || LINEAR || — || align=right | 2.8 km || 
|-id=258 bgcolor=#d6d6d6
| 121258 ||  || — || September 7, 1999 || Socorro || LINEAR || EOS || align=right | 4.3 km || 
|-id=259 bgcolor=#E9E9E9
| 121259 ||  || — || September 7, 1999 || Socorro || LINEAR || — || align=right | 3.5 km || 
|-id=260 bgcolor=#E9E9E9
| 121260 ||  || — || September 7, 1999 || Socorro || LINEAR || — || align=right | 1.9 km || 
|-id=261 bgcolor=#E9E9E9
| 121261 ||  || — || September 7, 1999 || Socorro || LINEAR || AGN || align=right | 2.4 km || 
|-id=262 bgcolor=#d6d6d6
| 121262 ||  || — || September 7, 1999 || Socorro || LINEAR || EOS || align=right | 3.6 km || 
|-id=263 bgcolor=#d6d6d6
| 121263 ||  || — || September 7, 1999 || Socorro || LINEAR || — || align=right | 5.0 km || 
|-id=264 bgcolor=#E9E9E9
| 121264 ||  || — || September 8, 1999 || Socorro || LINEAR || — || align=right | 2.1 km || 
|-id=265 bgcolor=#d6d6d6
| 121265 ||  || — || September 8, 1999 || Socorro || LINEAR || — || align=right | 4.8 km || 
|-id=266 bgcolor=#E9E9E9
| 121266 ||  || — || September 8, 1999 || Socorro || LINEAR || — || align=right | 3.7 km || 
|-id=267 bgcolor=#d6d6d6
| 121267 ||  || — || September 8, 1999 || Socorro || LINEAR || — || align=right | 4.6 km || 
|-id=268 bgcolor=#fefefe
| 121268 ||  || — || September 8, 1999 || Socorro || LINEAR || — || align=right | 2.7 km || 
|-id=269 bgcolor=#E9E9E9
| 121269 ||  || — || September 8, 1999 || Socorro || LINEAR || GEF || align=right | 3.1 km || 
|-id=270 bgcolor=#E9E9E9
| 121270 ||  || — || September 9, 1999 || Socorro || LINEAR || PAD || align=right | 3.7 km || 
|-id=271 bgcolor=#d6d6d6
| 121271 ||  || — || September 9, 1999 || Socorro || LINEAR || — || align=right | 5.4 km || 
|-id=272 bgcolor=#E9E9E9
| 121272 ||  || — || September 9, 1999 || Socorro || LINEAR || — || align=right | 3.6 km || 
|-id=273 bgcolor=#E9E9E9
| 121273 ||  || — || September 9, 1999 || Socorro || LINEAR || — || align=right | 2.1 km || 
|-id=274 bgcolor=#E9E9E9
| 121274 ||  || — || September 9, 1999 || Socorro || LINEAR || MAR || align=right | 2.4 km || 
|-id=275 bgcolor=#E9E9E9
| 121275 ||  || — || September 9, 1999 || Socorro || LINEAR || — || align=right | 6.8 km || 
|-id=276 bgcolor=#E9E9E9
| 121276 ||  || — || September 9, 1999 || Socorro || LINEAR || — || align=right | 3.5 km || 
|-id=277 bgcolor=#E9E9E9
| 121277 ||  || — || September 9, 1999 || Socorro || LINEAR || MAR || align=right | 3.3 km || 
|-id=278 bgcolor=#E9E9E9
| 121278 ||  || — || September 9, 1999 || Socorro || LINEAR || — || align=right | 4.9 km || 
|-id=279 bgcolor=#E9E9E9
| 121279 ||  || — || September 9, 1999 || Socorro || LINEAR || — || align=right | 3.0 km || 
|-id=280 bgcolor=#E9E9E9
| 121280 ||  || — || September 9, 1999 || Socorro || LINEAR || AGN || align=right | 2.1 km || 
|-id=281 bgcolor=#d6d6d6
| 121281 ||  || — || September 9, 1999 || Socorro || LINEAR || — || align=right | 4.6 km || 
|-id=282 bgcolor=#d6d6d6
| 121282 ||  || — || September 9, 1999 || Socorro || LINEAR || — || align=right | 3.5 km || 
|-id=283 bgcolor=#d6d6d6
| 121283 ||  || — || September 9, 1999 || Socorro || LINEAR || — || align=right | 2.5 km || 
|-id=284 bgcolor=#E9E9E9
| 121284 ||  || — || September 9, 1999 || Socorro || LINEAR || — || align=right | 4.6 km || 
|-id=285 bgcolor=#d6d6d6
| 121285 ||  || — || September 9, 1999 || Socorro || LINEAR || — || align=right | 4.9 km || 
|-id=286 bgcolor=#E9E9E9
| 121286 ||  || — || September 9, 1999 || Socorro || LINEAR || — || align=right | 2.4 km || 
|-id=287 bgcolor=#d6d6d6
| 121287 ||  || — || September 9, 1999 || Socorro || LINEAR || — || align=right | 5.2 km || 
|-id=288 bgcolor=#E9E9E9
| 121288 ||  || — || September 9, 1999 || Socorro || LINEAR || EUN || align=right | 2.0 km || 
|-id=289 bgcolor=#d6d6d6
| 121289 ||  || — || September 9, 1999 || Socorro || LINEAR || — || align=right | 5.0 km || 
|-id=290 bgcolor=#d6d6d6
| 121290 ||  || — || September 9, 1999 || Socorro || LINEAR || — || align=right | 4.3 km || 
|-id=291 bgcolor=#d6d6d6
| 121291 ||  || — || September 9, 1999 || Socorro || LINEAR || — || align=right | 4.3 km || 
|-id=292 bgcolor=#E9E9E9
| 121292 ||  || — || September 9, 1999 || Socorro || LINEAR || — || align=right | 2.0 km || 
|-id=293 bgcolor=#E9E9E9
| 121293 ||  || — || September 9, 1999 || Socorro || LINEAR || INOslow || align=right | 2.4 km || 
|-id=294 bgcolor=#E9E9E9
| 121294 ||  || — || September 9, 1999 || Socorro || LINEAR || — || align=right | 1.8 km || 
|-id=295 bgcolor=#E9E9E9
| 121295 ||  || — || September 9, 1999 || Socorro || LINEAR || — || align=right | 1.6 km || 
|-id=296 bgcolor=#d6d6d6
| 121296 ||  || — || September 13, 1999 || Socorro || LINEAR || — || align=right | 4.8 km || 
|-id=297 bgcolor=#d6d6d6
| 121297 ||  || — || September 8, 1999 || Socorro || LINEAR || ALA || align=right | 6.2 km || 
|-id=298 bgcolor=#d6d6d6
| 121298 ||  || — || September 9, 1999 || Socorro || LINEAR || — || align=right | 3.6 km || 
|-id=299 bgcolor=#d6d6d6
| 121299 ||  || — || September 8, 1999 || Socorro || LINEAR || — || align=right | 4.2 km || 
|-id=300 bgcolor=#E9E9E9
| 121300 ||  || — || September 8, 1999 || Socorro || LINEAR || — || align=right | 5.9 km || 
|}

121301–121400 

|-bgcolor=#d6d6d6
| 121301 ||  || — || September 8, 1999 || Socorro || LINEAR || EOS || align=right | 3.5 km || 
|-id=302 bgcolor=#E9E9E9
| 121302 ||  || — || September 8, 1999 || Socorro || LINEAR || — || align=right | 7.4 km || 
|-id=303 bgcolor=#E9E9E9
| 121303 ||  || — || September 8, 1999 || Socorro || LINEAR || — || align=right | 5.2 km || 
|-id=304 bgcolor=#E9E9E9
| 121304 ||  || — || September 8, 1999 || Socorro || LINEAR || — || align=right | 6.0 km || 
|-id=305 bgcolor=#d6d6d6
| 121305 ||  || — || September 8, 1999 || Socorro || LINEAR || — || align=right | 4.9 km || 
|-id=306 bgcolor=#E9E9E9
| 121306 ||  || — || September 8, 1999 || Socorro || LINEAR || DOR || align=right | 5.6 km || 
|-id=307 bgcolor=#d6d6d6
| 121307 ||  || — || September 8, 1999 || Socorro || LINEAR || — || align=right | 6.2 km || 
|-id=308 bgcolor=#d6d6d6
| 121308 ||  || — || September 8, 1999 || Socorro || LINEAR || — || align=right | 7.1 km || 
|-id=309 bgcolor=#d6d6d6
| 121309 ||  || — || September 8, 1999 || Socorro || LINEAR || — || align=right | 4.5 km || 
|-id=310 bgcolor=#d6d6d6
| 121310 ||  || — || September 8, 1999 || Socorro || LINEAR || — || align=right | 4.3 km || 
|-id=311 bgcolor=#d6d6d6
| 121311 ||  || — || September 8, 1999 || Socorro || LINEAR || — || align=right | 5.0 km || 
|-id=312 bgcolor=#d6d6d6
| 121312 ||  || — || September 8, 1999 || Socorro || LINEAR || EOS || align=right | 3.9 km || 
|-id=313 bgcolor=#E9E9E9
| 121313 Tamsin ||  ||  || September 8, 1999 || Uccle || T. Pauwels || — || align=right | 2.0 km || 
|-id=314 bgcolor=#E9E9E9
| 121314 ||  || — || September 4, 1999 || Anderson Mesa || LONEOS || — || align=right | 2.2 km || 
|-id=315 bgcolor=#E9E9E9
| 121315 Mikelentz ||  ||  || September 4, 1999 || Catalina || CSS || VIB || align=right | 3.7 km || 
|-id=316 bgcolor=#E9E9E9
| 121316 ||  || — || September 5, 1999 || Anderson Mesa || LONEOS || — || align=right | 4.6 km || 
|-id=317 bgcolor=#d6d6d6
| 121317 ||  || — || September 7, 1999 || Socorro || LINEAR || — || align=right | 5.4 km || 
|-id=318 bgcolor=#E9E9E9
| 121318 ||  || — || September 4, 1999 || Anderson Mesa || LONEOS || — || align=right | 3.9 km || 
|-id=319 bgcolor=#E9E9E9
| 121319 ||  || — || September 5, 1999 || Kitt Peak || Spacewatch || PAE || align=right | 3.0 km || 
|-id=320 bgcolor=#d6d6d6
| 121320 ||  || — || September 6, 1999 || Kitt Peak || Spacewatch || — || align=right | 5.0 km || 
|-id=321 bgcolor=#E9E9E9
| 121321 || 1999 SH || — || September 16, 1999 || Višnjan Observatory || K. Korlević || — || align=right | 4.4 km || 
|-id=322 bgcolor=#E9E9E9
| 121322 ||  || — || September 19, 1999 || Ondřejov || L. Kotková || — || align=right | 2.3 km || 
|-id=323 bgcolor=#d6d6d6
| 121323 ||  || — || September 22, 1999 || Socorro || LINEAR || — || align=right | 6.2 km || 
|-id=324 bgcolor=#FA8072
| 121324 ||  || — || September 30, 1999 || Socorro || LINEAR || H || align=right | 1.7 km || 
|-id=325 bgcolor=#fefefe
| 121325 ||  || — || September 30, 1999 || Socorro || LINEAR || H || align=right | 1.2 km || 
|-id=326 bgcolor=#d6d6d6
| 121326 ||  || — || September 22, 1999 || Socorro || LINEAR || — || align=right | 6.7 km || 
|-id=327 bgcolor=#d6d6d6
| 121327 Andreweaker ||  ||  || September 30, 1999 || Catalina || CSS || THM || align=right | 3.5 km || 
|-id=328 bgcolor=#d6d6d6
| 121328 Devlynrfennell ||  ||  || September 29, 1999 || Catalina || CSS || — || align=right | 4.9 km || 
|-id=329 bgcolor=#d6d6d6
| 121329 Getzandanner ||  ||  || September 30, 1999 || Catalina || CSS || — || align=right | 4.9 km || 
|-id=330 bgcolor=#d6d6d6
| 121330 Colbygoodloe ||  ||  || September 29, 1999 || Catalina || CSS || — || align=right | 3.2 km || 
|-id=331 bgcolor=#d6d6d6
| 121331 Savannahsalazar ||  ||  || September 30, 1999 || Catalina || CSS || — || align=right | 3.7 km || 
|-id=332 bgcolor=#d6d6d6
| 121332 Jasonhair ||  ||  || September 29, 1999 || Catalina || CSS || HYG || align=right | 5.2 km || 
|-id=333 bgcolor=#d6d6d6
| 121333 ||  || — || October 4, 1999 || Prescott || P. G. Comba || KOR || align=right | 2.1 km || 
|-id=334 bgcolor=#d6d6d6
| 121334 ||  || — || October 3, 1999 || Stroncone || Santa Lucia Obs. || EOS || align=right | 3.8 km || 
|-id=335 bgcolor=#fefefe
| 121335 ||  || — || October 2, 1999 || Socorro || LINEAR || H || align=right | 1.0 km || 
|-id=336 bgcolor=#d6d6d6
| 121336 ||  || — || October 6, 1999 || Modra || L. Kornoš, J. Tóth || — || align=right | 6.3 km || 
|-id=337 bgcolor=#E9E9E9
| 121337 ||  || — || October 1, 1999 || Farra d'Isonzo || Farra d'Isonzo || — || align=right | 3.0 km || 
|-id=338 bgcolor=#d6d6d6
| 121338 ||  || — || October 1, 1999 || Farra d'Isonzo || Farra d'Isonzo || — || align=right | 4.8 km || 
|-id=339 bgcolor=#d6d6d6
| 121339 ||  || — || October 13, 1999 || Ondřejov || P. Kušnirák, P. Pravec || KOR || align=right | 2.4 km || 
|-id=340 bgcolor=#fefefe
| 121340 ||  || — || October 15, 1999 || Prescott || P. G. Comba || H || align=right | 1.5 km || 
|-id=341 bgcolor=#d6d6d6
| 121341 ||  || — || October 15, 1999 || Višnjan Observatory || K. Korlević || — || align=right | 6.8 km || 
|-id=342 bgcolor=#E9E9E9
| 121342 ||  || — || October 10, 1999 || Xinglong || SCAP || — || align=right | 6.5 km || 
|-id=343 bgcolor=#E9E9E9
| 121343 ||  || — || October 3, 1999 || Socorro || LINEAR || — || align=right | 3.6 km || 
|-id=344 bgcolor=#E9E9E9
| 121344 ||  || — || October 4, 1999 || Socorro || LINEAR || fast? || align=right | 2.6 km || 
|-id=345 bgcolor=#E9E9E9
| 121345 ||  || — || October 4, 1999 || Socorro || LINEAR || — || align=right | 3.4 km || 
|-id=346 bgcolor=#d6d6d6
| 121346 ||  || — || October 4, 1999 || Socorro || LINEAR || — || align=right | 5.3 km || 
|-id=347 bgcolor=#d6d6d6
| 121347 ||  || — || October 4, 1999 || Socorro || LINEAR || — || align=right | 4.8 km || 
|-id=348 bgcolor=#d6d6d6
| 121348 ||  || — || October 4, 1999 || Socorro || LINEAR || TIR || align=right | 3.8 km || 
|-id=349 bgcolor=#fefefe
| 121349 ||  || — || October 2, 1999 || Socorro || LINEAR || H || align=right | 1.3 km || 
|-id=350 bgcolor=#fefefe
| 121350 ||  || — || October 3, 1999 || Socorro || LINEAR || H || align=right | 1.6 km || 
|-id=351 bgcolor=#fefefe
| 121351 ||  || — || October 4, 1999 || Socorro || LINEAR || H || align=right | 1.7 km || 
|-id=352 bgcolor=#E9E9E9
| 121352 Taylorhale ||  ||  || October 1, 1999 || Catalina || CSS || — || align=right | 3.7 km || 
|-id=353 bgcolor=#d6d6d6
| 121353 ||  || — || October 3, 1999 || Catalina || CSS || — || align=right | 7.2 km || 
|-id=354 bgcolor=#d6d6d6
| 121354 ||  || — || October 4, 1999 || Kitt Peak || Spacewatch || HYG || align=right | 3.6 km || 
|-id=355 bgcolor=#E9E9E9
| 121355 ||  || — || October 4, 1999 || Kitt Peak || Spacewatch || — || align=right | 2.9 km || 
|-id=356 bgcolor=#d6d6d6
| 121356 ||  || — || October 4, 1999 || Kitt Peak || Spacewatch || — || align=right | 4.8 km || 
|-id=357 bgcolor=#d6d6d6
| 121357 ||  || — || October 6, 1999 || Kitt Peak || Spacewatch || — || align=right | 4.2 km || 
|-id=358 bgcolor=#d6d6d6
| 121358 ||  || — || October 6, 1999 || Kitt Peak || Spacewatch || — || align=right | 4.5 km || 
|-id=359 bgcolor=#E9E9E9
| 121359 ||  || — || October 6, 1999 || Kitt Peak || Spacewatch || WIT || align=right | 2.0 km || 
|-id=360 bgcolor=#d6d6d6
| 121360 ||  || — || October 6, 1999 || Kitt Peak || Spacewatch || — || align=right | 3.8 km || 
|-id=361 bgcolor=#d6d6d6
| 121361 ||  || — || October 7, 1999 || Kitt Peak || Spacewatch || — || align=right | 4.1 km || 
|-id=362 bgcolor=#d6d6d6
| 121362 ||  || — || October 7, 1999 || Kitt Peak || Spacewatch || — || align=right | 5.0 km || 
|-id=363 bgcolor=#E9E9E9
| 121363 ||  || — || October 7, 1999 || Kitt Peak || Spacewatch || AGN || align=right | 1.8 km || 
|-id=364 bgcolor=#d6d6d6
| 121364 ||  || — || October 7, 1999 || Kitt Peak || Spacewatch || — || align=right | 4.8 km || 
|-id=365 bgcolor=#E9E9E9
| 121365 ||  || — || October 8, 1999 || Kitt Peak || Spacewatch || — || align=right | 3.4 km || 
|-id=366 bgcolor=#d6d6d6
| 121366 ||  || — || October 8, 1999 || Kitt Peak || Spacewatch || — || align=right | 6.7 km || 
|-id=367 bgcolor=#d6d6d6
| 121367 ||  || — || October 8, 1999 || Kitt Peak || Spacewatch || — || align=right | 3.3 km || 
|-id=368 bgcolor=#d6d6d6
| 121368 ||  || — || October 9, 1999 || Kitt Peak || Spacewatch || KOR || align=right | 3.1 km || 
|-id=369 bgcolor=#d6d6d6
| 121369 ||  || — || October 9, 1999 || Kitt Peak || Spacewatch || THM || align=right | 4.8 km || 
|-id=370 bgcolor=#E9E9E9
| 121370 ||  || — || October 9, 1999 || Kitt Peak || Spacewatch || — || align=right | 4.1 km || 
|-id=371 bgcolor=#E9E9E9
| 121371 ||  || — || October 10, 1999 || Kitt Peak || Spacewatch || — || align=right | 3.9 km || 
|-id=372 bgcolor=#d6d6d6
| 121372 ||  || — || October 11, 1999 || Kitt Peak || Spacewatch || — || align=right | 3.7 km || 
|-id=373 bgcolor=#d6d6d6
| 121373 ||  || — || October 11, 1999 || Kitt Peak || Spacewatch || — || align=right | 3.8 km || 
|-id=374 bgcolor=#fefefe
| 121374 ||  || — || October 11, 1999 || Kitt Peak || Spacewatch || — || align=right | 1.1 km || 
|-id=375 bgcolor=#d6d6d6
| 121375 ||  || — || October 11, 1999 || Kitt Peak || Spacewatch || — || align=right | 6.2 km || 
|-id=376 bgcolor=#fefefe
| 121376 ||  || — || October 13, 1999 || Kitt Peak || Spacewatch || MAS || align=right | 1.9 km || 
|-id=377 bgcolor=#d6d6d6
| 121377 ||  || — || October 14, 1999 || Kitt Peak || Spacewatch || KOR || align=right | 2.2 km || 
|-id=378 bgcolor=#d6d6d6
| 121378 ||  || — || October 15, 1999 || Kitt Peak || Spacewatch || KOR || align=right | 2.2 km || 
|-id=379 bgcolor=#d6d6d6
| 121379 ||  || — || October 15, 1999 || Kitt Peak || Spacewatch || — || align=right | 3.1 km || 
|-id=380 bgcolor=#E9E9E9
| 121380 ||  || — || October 2, 1999 || Socorro || LINEAR || — || align=right | 4.1 km || 
|-id=381 bgcolor=#d6d6d6
| 121381 ||  || — || October 2, 1999 || Socorro || LINEAR || — || align=right | 4.1 km || 
|-id=382 bgcolor=#fefefe
| 121382 ||  || — || October 2, 1999 || Socorro || LINEAR || — || align=right | 1.8 km || 
|-id=383 bgcolor=#d6d6d6
| 121383 ||  || — || October 2, 1999 || Socorro || LINEAR || HYG || align=right | 4.4 km || 
|-id=384 bgcolor=#d6d6d6
| 121384 ||  || — || October 3, 1999 || Socorro || LINEAR || — || align=right | 6.3 km || 
|-id=385 bgcolor=#d6d6d6
| 121385 ||  || — || October 4, 1999 || Socorro || LINEAR || — || align=right | 4.0 km || 
|-id=386 bgcolor=#d6d6d6
| 121386 ||  || — || October 4, 1999 || Socorro || LINEAR || — || align=right | 3.8 km || 
|-id=387 bgcolor=#d6d6d6
| 121387 ||  || — || October 4, 1999 || Socorro || LINEAR || — || align=right | 5.9 km || 
|-id=388 bgcolor=#E9E9E9
| 121388 ||  || — || October 4, 1999 || Socorro || LINEAR || — || align=right | 5.1 km || 
|-id=389 bgcolor=#d6d6d6
| 121389 ||  || — || October 4, 1999 || Socorro || LINEAR || — || align=right | 4.8 km || 
|-id=390 bgcolor=#E9E9E9
| 121390 ||  || — || October 4, 1999 || Socorro || LINEAR || GEF || align=right | 2.8 km || 
|-id=391 bgcolor=#E9E9E9
| 121391 ||  || — || October 4, 1999 || Socorro || LINEAR || PAD || align=right | 3.9 km || 
|-id=392 bgcolor=#d6d6d6
| 121392 ||  || — || October 4, 1999 || Socorro || LINEAR || — || align=right | 2.9 km || 
|-id=393 bgcolor=#E9E9E9
| 121393 ||  || — || October 4, 1999 || Socorro || LINEAR || — || align=right | 3.9 km || 
|-id=394 bgcolor=#E9E9E9
| 121394 ||  || — || October 4, 1999 || Socorro || LINEAR || EUN || align=right | 2.4 km || 
|-id=395 bgcolor=#E9E9E9
| 121395 ||  || — || October 4, 1999 || Socorro || LINEAR || — || align=right | 1.9 km || 
|-id=396 bgcolor=#d6d6d6
| 121396 ||  || — || October 4, 1999 || Socorro || LINEAR || — || align=right | 5.9 km || 
|-id=397 bgcolor=#d6d6d6
| 121397 ||  || — || October 4, 1999 || Socorro || LINEAR || — || align=right | 5.5 km || 
|-id=398 bgcolor=#E9E9E9
| 121398 ||  || — || October 6, 1999 || Socorro || LINEAR || — || align=right | 2.1 km || 
|-id=399 bgcolor=#E9E9E9
| 121399 ||  || — || October 6, 1999 || Socorro || LINEAR || — || align=right | 3.6 km || 
|-id=400 bgcolor=#E9E9E9
| 121400 ||  || — || October 6, 1999 || Socorro || LINEAR || — || align=right | 1.6 km || 
|}

121401–121500 

|-bgcolor=#E9E9E9
| 121401 ||  || — || October 6, 1999 || Socorro || LINEAR || — || align=right | 4.6 km || 
|-id=402 bgcolor=#E9E9E9
| 121402 ||  || — || October 6, 1999 || Socorro || LINEAR || — || align=right | 2.4 km || 
|-id=403 bgcolor=#E9E9E9
| 121403 ||  || — || October 6, 1999 || Socorro || LINEAR || — || align=right | 4.0 km || 
|-id=404 bgcolor=#fefefe
| 121404 ||  || — || October 6, 1999 || Socorro || LINEAR || NYS || align=right | 1.5 km || 
|-id=405 bgcolor=#d6d6d6
| 121405 ||  || — || October 6, 1999 || Socorro || LINEAR || EOS || align=right | 4.4 km || 
|-id=406 bgcolor=#d6d6d6
| 121406 ||  || — || October 6, 1999 || Socorro || LINEAR || KOR || align=right | 2.4 km || 
|-id=407 bgcolor=#E9E9E9
| 121407 ||  || — || October 6, 1999 || Socorro || LINEAR || — || align=right | 2.9 km || 
|-id=408 bgcolor=#E9E9E9
| 121408 ||  || — || October 6, 1999 || Socorro || LINEAR || — || align=right | 2.5 km || 
|-id=409 bgcolor=#E9E9E9
| 121409 ||  || — || October 6, 1999 || Socorro || LINEAR || — || align=right | 3.9 km || 
|-id=410 bgcolor=#d6d6d6
| 121410 ||  || — || October 15, 1999 || Socorro || LINEAR || — || align=right | 4.8 km || 
|-id=411 bgcolor=#d6d6d6
| 121411 ||  || — || October 6, 1999 || Socorro || LINEAR || — || align=right | 5.7 km || 
|-id=412 bgcolor=#E9E9E9
| 121412 ||  || — || October 7, 1999 || Socorro || LINEAR || AGN || align=right | 2.2 km || 
|-id=413 bgcolor=#E9E9E9
| 121413 ||  || — || October 7, 1999 || Socorro || LINEAR || MIS || align=right | 4.1 km || 
|-id=414 bgcolor=#d6d6d6
| 121414 ||  || — || October 7, 1999 || Socorro || LINEAR || — || align=right | 4.2 km || 
|-id=415 bgcolor=#d6d6d6
| 121415 ||  || — || October 7, 1999 || Socorro || LINEAR || HYG || align=right | 2.7 km || 
|-id=416 bgcolor=#d6d6d6
| 121416 ||  || — || October 7, 1999 || Socorro || LINEAR || KOR || align=right | 2.6 km || 
|-id=417 bgcolor=#d6d6d6
| 121417 ||  || — || October 7, 1999 || Socorro || LINEAR || — || align=right | 2.9 km || 
|-id=418 bgcolor=#d6d6d6
| 121418 ||  || — || October 7, 1999 || Socorro || LINEAR || — || align=right | 4.0 km || 
|-id=419 bgcolor=#d6d6d6
| 121419 ||  || — || October 7, 1999 || Socorro || LINEAR || HYG || align=right | 5.2 km || 
|-id=420 bgcolor=#d6d6d6
| 121420 ||  || — || October 7, 1999 || Socorro || LINEAR || EOS || align=right | 3.4 km || 
|-id=421 bgcolor=#d6d6d6
| 121421 ||  || — || October 7, 1999 || Socorro || LINEAR || — || align=right | 5.8 km || 
|-id=422 bgcolor=#d6d6d6
| 121422 ||  || — || October 7, 1999 || Socorro || LINEAR || THM || align=right | 4.3 km || 
|-id=423 bgcolor=#d6d6d6
| 121423 ||  || — || October 7, 1999 || Socorro || LINEAR || — || align=right | 2.8 km || 
|-id=424 bgcolor=#d6d6d6
| 121424 ||  || — || October 7, 1999 || Socorro || LINEAR || — || align=right | 4.4 km || 
|-id=425 bgcolor=#d6d6d6
| 121425 ||  || — || October 7, 1999 || Socorro || LINEAR || LIX || align=right | 5.7 km || 
|-id=426 bgcolor=#E9E9E9
| 121426 ||  || — || October 7, 1999 || Socorro || LINEAR || — || align=right | 2.9 km || 
|-id=427 bgcolor=#d6d6d6
| 121427 ||  || — || October 7, 1999 || Socorro || LINEAR || — || align=right | 6.7 km || 
|-id=428 bgcolor=#E9E9E9
| 121428 ||  || — || October 9, 1999 || Socorro || LINEAR || HOF || align=right | 5.0 km || 
|-id=429 bgcolor=#E9E9E9
| 121429 ||  || — || October 10, 1999 || Socorro || LINEAR || — || align=right | 6.1 km || 
|-id=430 bgcolor=#E9E9E9
| 121430 ||  || — || October 10, 1999 || Socorro || LINEAR || — || align=right | 4.3 km || 
|-id=431 bgcolor=#E9E9E9
| 121431 ||  || — || October 10, 1999 || Socorro || LINEAR || — || align=right | 3.8 km || 
|-id=432 bgcolor=#fefefe
| 121432 ||  || — || October 10, 1999 || Socorro || LINEAR || — || align=right | 1.3 km || 
|-id=433 bgcolor=#d6d6d6
| 121433 ||  || — || October 10, 1999 || Socorro || LINEAR || — || align=right | 4.5 km || 
|-id=434 bgcolor=#d6d6d6
| 121434 ||  || — || October 10, 1999 || Socorro || LINEAR || — || align=right | 5.5 km || 
|-id=435 bgcolor=#d6d6d6
| 121435 ||  || — || October 10, 1999 || Socorro || LINEAR || — || align=right | 5.4 km || 
|-id=436 bgcolor=#d6d6d6
| 121436 ||  || — || October 11, 1999 || Socorro || LINEAR || — || align=right | 7.4 km || 
|-id=437 bgcolor=#d6d6d6
| 121437 ||  || — || October 12, 1999 || Socorro || LINEAR || — || align=right | 2.9 km || 
|-id=438 bgcolor=#d6d6d6
| 121438 ||  || — || October 12, 1999 || Socorro || LINEAR || — || align=right | 6.4 km || 
|-id=439 bgcolor=#d6d6d6
| 121439 ||  || — || October 12, 1999 || Socorro || LINEAR || — || align=right | 2.5 km || 
|-id=440 bgcolor=#d6d6d6
| 121440 ||  || — || October 12, 1999 || Socorro || LINEAR || TIR || align=right | 3.0 km || 
|-id=441 bgcolor=#d6d6d6
| 121441 ||  || — || October 12, 1999 || Socorro || LINEAR || — || align=right | 5.2 km || 
|-id=442 bgcolor=#fefefe
| 121442 ||  || — || October 12, 1999 || Socorro || LINEAR || H || align=right | 1.2 km || 
|-id=443 bgcolor=#d6d6d6
| 121443 ||  || — || October 12, 1999 || Socorro || LINEAR || EOS || align=right | 3.7 km || 
|-id=444 bgcolor=#d6d6d6
| 121444 ||  || — || October 12, 1999 || Socorro || LINEAR || — || align=right | 8.4 km || 
|-id=445 bgcolor=#d6d6d6
| 121445 ||  || — || October 12, 1999 || Socorro || LINEAR || EOS || align=right | 4.2 km || 
|-id=446 bgcolor=#d6d6d6
| 121446 ||  || — || October 12, 1999 || Socorro || LINEAR || — || align=right | 4.4 km || 
|-id=447 bgcolor=#d6d6d6
| 121447 ||  || — || October 12, 1999 || Socorro || LINEAR || JLI || align=right | 8.3 km || 
|-id=448 bgcolor=#d6d6d6
| 121448 ||  || — || October 12, 1999 || Socorro || LINEAR || — || align=right | 6.5 km || 
|-id=449 bgcolor=#d6d6d6
| 121449 ||  || — || October 12, 1999 || Socorro || LINEAR || EOS || align=right | 3.2 km || 
|-id=450 bgcolor=#d6d6d6
| 121450 ||  || — || October 12, 1999 || Socorro || LINEAR || TEL || align=right | 2.8 km || 
|-id=451 bgcolor=#d6d6d6
| 121451 ||  || — || October 12, 1999 || Socorro || LINEAR || — || align=right | 6.5 km || 
|-id=452 bgcolor=#E9E9E9
| 121452 ||  || — || October 12, 1999 || Socorro || LINEAR || — || align=right | 4.1 km || 
|-id=453 bgcolor=#d6d6d6
| 121453 ||  || — || October 12, 1999 || Socorro || LINEAR || EOS || align=right | 3.2 km || 
|-id=454 bgcolor=#d6d6d6
| 121454 ||  || — || October 13, 1999 || Socorro || LINEAR || — || align=right | 4.5 km || 
|-id=455 bgcolor=#E9E9E9
| 121455 ||  || — || October 13, 1999 || Socorro || LINEAR || HEN || align=right | 2.0 km || 
|-id=456 bgcolor=#d6d6d6
| 121456 ||  || — || October 14, 1999 || Socorro || LINEAR || — || align=right | 5.2 km || 
|-id=457 bgcolor=#fefefe
| 121457 ||  || — || October 14, 1999 || Socorro || LINEAR || H || align=right | 1.1 km || 
|-id=458 bgcolor=#fefefe
| 121458 ||  || — || October 14, 1999 || Socorro || LINEAR || H || align=right data-sort-value="0.85" | 850 m || 
|-id=459 bgcolor=#d6d6d6
| 121459 ||  || — || October 14, 1999 || Socorro || LINEAR || — || align=right | 4.3 km || 
|-id=460 bgcolor=#d6d6d6
| 121460 ||  || — || October 14, 1999 || Socorro || LINEAR || — || align=right | 7.0 km || 
|-id=461 bgcolor=#fefefe
| 121461 ||  || — || October 14, 1999 || Socorro || LINEAR || H || align=right | 1.2 km || 
|-id=462 bgcolor=#d6d6d6
| 121462 ||  || — || October 14, 1999 || Socorro || LINEAR || — || align=right | 6.3 km || 
|-id=463 bgcolor=#E9E9E9
| 121463 ||  || — || October 14, 1999 || Socorro || LINEAR || — || align=right | 5.5 km || 
|-id=464 bgcolor=#d6d6d6
| 121464 ||  || — || October 14, 1999 || Socorro || LINEAR || — || align=right | 5.0 km || 
|-id=465 bgcolor=#E9E9E9
| 121465 ||  || — || October 15, 1999 || Socorro || LINEAR || PAD || align=right | 4.1 km || 
|-id=466 bgcolor=#d6d6d6
| 121466 ||  || — || October 15, 1999 || Socorro || LINEAR || THM || align=right | 4.8 km || 
|-id=467 bgcolor=#d6d6d6
| 121467 ||  || — || October 15, 1999 || Socorro || LINEAR || — || align=right | 5.9 km || 
|-id=468 bgcolor=#d6d6d6
| 121468 Msovinskihaskell ||  ||  || October 1, 1999 || Catalina || CSS || — || align=right | 5.9 km || 
|-id=469 bgcolor=#d6d6d6
| 121469 Sarahaugh ||  ||  || October 1, 1999 || Catalina || CSS || KOR || align=right | 2.9 km || 
|-id=470 bgcolor=#d6d6d6
| 121470 ||  || — || October 2, 1999 || Anderson Mesa || LONEOS || VER || align=right | 7.0 km || 
|-id=471 bgcolor=#E9E9E9
| 121471 ||  || — || October 2, 1999 || Kitt Peak || Spacewatch || — || align=right | 3.3 km || 
|-id=472 bgcolor=#E9E9E9
| 121472 ||  || — || October 2, 1999 || Kitt Peak || Spacewatch || — || align=right | 1.7 km || 
|-id=473 bgcolor=#d6d6d6
| 121473 ||  || — || October 2, 1999 || Kitt Peak || Spacewatch || — || align=right | 4.3 km || 
|-id=474 bgcolor=#E9E9E9
| 121474 ||  || — || October 1, 1999 || Kitt Peak || Spacewatch || — || align=right | 4.2 km || 
|-id=475 bgcolor=#d6d6d6
| 121475 ||  || — || October 12, 1999 || Socorro || LINEAR || — || align=right | 3.7 km || 
|-id=476 bgcolor=#d6d6d6
| 121476 ||  || — || October 5, 1999 || Catalina || CSS || HYG || align=right | 4.8 km || 
|-id=477 bgcolor=#d6d6d6
| 121477 ||  || — || October 7, 1999 || Socorro || LINEAR || — || align=right | 3.6 km || 
|-id=478 bgcolor=#E9E9E9
| 121478 ||  || — || October 3, 1999 || Socorro || LINEAR || — || align=right | 4.6 km || 
|-id=479 bgcolor=#d6d6d6
| 121479 Hendershot ||  ||  || October 3, 1999 || Catalina || CSS || HYG || align=right | 5.6 km || 
|-id=480 bgcolor=#E9E9E9
| 121480 Dolanhighsmith ||  ||  || October 4, 1999 || Catalina || CSS || AGN || align=right | 3.0 km || 
|-id=481 bgcolor=#E9E9E9
| 121481 Reganhoward ||  ||  || October 4, 1999 || Catalina || CSS || WIT || align=right | 2.1 km || 
|-id=482 bgcolor=#d6d6d6
| 121482 ||  || — || October 4, 1999 || Catalina || CSS || — || align=right | 3.4 km || 
|-id=483 bgcolor=#d6d6d6
| 121483 Griffinjayne ||  ||  || October 4, 1999 || Catalina || CSS || — || align=right | 6.3 km || 
|-id=484 bgcolor=#d6d6d6
| 121484 ||  || — || October 6, 1999 || Kitt Peak || Spacewatch || — || align=right | 5.1 km || 
|-id=485 bgcolor=#d6d6d6
| 121485 ||  || — || October 7, 1999 || Catalina || CSS || HYG || align=right | 5.3 km || 
|-id=486 bgcolor=#fefefe
| 121486 Sarahkirby ||  ||  || October 7, 1999 || Catalina || CSS || H || align=right | 1.1 km || 
|-id=487 bgcolor=#d6d6d6
| 121487 ||  || — || October 11, 1999 || Anderson Mesa || LONEOS || — || align=right | 5.0 km || 
|-id=488 bgcolor=#E9E9E9
| 121488 ||  || — || October 8, 1999 || Catalina || CSS || TIN || align=right | 4.0 km || 
|-id=489 bgcolor=#d6d6d6
| 121489 ||  || — || October 9, 1999 || Kitt Peak || Spacewatch || — || align=right | 5.3 km || 
|-id=490 bgcolor=#E9E9E9
| 121490 ||  || — || October 9, 1999 || Kitt Peak || Spacewatch || AGN || align=right | 2.1 km || 
|-id=491 bgcolor=#d6d6d6
| 121491 ||  || — || October 9, 1999 || Socorro || LINEAR || — || align=right | 4.5 km || 
|-id=492 bgcolor=#d6d6d6
| 121492 ||  || — || October 15, 1999 || Anderson Mesa || LONEOS || — || align=right | 4.4 km || 
|-id=493 bgcolor=#d6d6d6
| 121493 ||  || — || October 15, 1999 || Kitt Peak || Spacewatch || — || align=right | 3.5 km || 
|-id=494 bgcolor=#d6d6d6
| 121494 ||  || — || October 3, 1999 || Socorro || LINEAR || — || align=right | 5.6 km || 
|-id=495 bgcolor=#d6d6d6
| 121495 ||  || — || October 3, 1999 || Socorro || LINEAR || BRA || align=right | 3.6 km || 
|-id=496 bgcolor=#d6d6d6
| 121496 ||  || — || October 3, 1999 || Socorro || LINEAR || — || align=right | 6.0 km || 
|-id=497 bgcolor=#d6d6d6
| 121497 ||  || — || October 3, 1999 || Socorro || LINEAR || — || align=right | 2.9 km || 
|-id=498 bgcolor=#d6d6d6
| 121498 ||  || — || October 3, 1999 || Socorro || LINEAR || — || align=right | 5.6 km || 
|-id=499 bgcolor=#d6d6d6
| 121499 ||  || — || October 3, 1999 || Socorro || LINEAR || — || align=right | 6.1 km || 
|-id=500 bgcolor=#d6d6d6
| 121500 ||  || — || October 5, 1999 || Socorro || LINEAR || — || align=right | 6.2 km || 
|}

121501–121600 

|-bgcolor=#fefefe
| 121501 ||  || — || October 5, 1999 || Socorro || LINEAR || H || align=right | 1.6 km || 
|-id=502 bgcolor=#d6d6d6
| 121502 ||  || — || October 5, 1999 || Socorro || LINEAR || TIR || align=right | 5.0 km || 
|-id=503 bgcolor=#E9E9E9
| 121503 ||  || — || October 10, 1999 || Socorro || LINEAR || — || align=right | 2.5 km || 
|-id=504 bgcolor=#d6d6d6
| 121504 ||  || — || October 12, 1999 || Socorro || LINEAR || EOS || align=right | 3.2 km || 
|-id=505 bgcolor=#E9E9E9
| 121505 Andrewliounis ||  ||  || October 1, 1999 || Catalina || CSS || HOF || align=right | 3.3 km || 
|-id=506 bgcolor=#E9E9E9
| 121506 Chrislorentson ||  ||  || October 3, 1999 || Catalina || CSS || — || align=right | 3.8 km || 
|-id=507 bgcolor=#E9E9E9
| 121507 ||  || — || October 4, 1999 || Kitt Peak || Spacewatch || — || align=right | 3.7 km || 
|-id=508 bgcolor=#E9E9E9
| 121508 ||  || — || October 4, 1999 || Kitt Peak || Spacewatch || — || align=right | 4.8 km || 
|-id=509 bgcolor=#d6d6d6
| 121509 ||  || — || October 6, 1999 || Kitt Peak || Spacewatch || — || align=right | 5.1 km || 
|-id=510 bgcolor=#d6d6d6
| 121510 ||  || — || October 3, 1999 || Kitt Peak || Spacewatch || KOR || align=right | 2.4 km || 
|-id=511 bgcolor=#fefefe
| 121511 ||  || — || October 9, 1999 || Socorro || LINEAR || — || align=right | 1.4 km || 
|-id=512 bgcolor=#fefefe
| 121512 ||  || — || October 5, 1999 || Socorro || LINEAR || H || align=right | 1.1 km || 
|-id=513 bgcolor=#d6d6d6
| 121513 ||  || — || October 28, 1999 || Xinglong || SCAP || — || align=right | 4.4 km || 
|-id=514 bgcolor=#FA8072
| 121514 ||  || — || October 30, 1999 || Socorro || LINEAR || — || align=right | 2.5 km || 
|-id=515 bgcolor=#fefefe
| 121515 ||  || — || October 31, 1999 || Socorro || LINEAR || H || align=right | 2.0 km || 
|-id=516 bgcolor=#d6d6d6
| 121516 ||  || — || October 31, 1999 || Socorro || LINEAR || Tj (2.98) || align=right | 8.0 km || 
|-id=517 bgcolor=#E9E9E9
| 121517 ||  || — || October 31, 1999 || Gnosca || S. Sposetti || — || align=right | 4.1 km || 
|-id=518 bgcolor=#d6d6d6
| 121518 ||  || — || October 29, 1999 || Kitt Peak || Spacewatch || — || align=right | 3.6 km || 
|-id=519 bgcolor=#E9E9E9
| 121519 ||  || — || October 30, 1999 || Kitt Peak || Spacewatch || AST || align=right | 3.9 km || 
|-id=520 bgcolor=#E9E9E9
| 121520 ||  || — || October 30, 1999 || Kitt Peak || Spacewatch || — || align=right | 2.2 km || 
|-id=521 bgcolor=#d6d6d6
| 121521 ||  || — || October 30, 1999 || Kitt Peak || Spacewatch || — || align=right | 4.8 km || 
|-id=522 bgcolor=#E9E9E9
| 121522 ||  || — || October 30, 1999 || Kitt Peak || Spacewatch || — || align=right | 3.5 km || 
|-id=523 bgcolor=#E9E9E9
| 121523 ||  || — || October 31, 1999 || Kitt Peak || Spacewatch || — || align=right | 2.9 km || 
|-id=524 bgcolor=#E9E9E9
| 121524 ||  || — || October 31, 1999 || Kitt Peak || Spacewatch || — || align=right | 3.0 km || 
|-id=525 bgcolor=#E9E9E9
| 121525 ||  || — || October 31, 1999 || Kitt Peak || Spacewatch || — || align=right | 3.1 km || 
|-id=526 bgcolor=#d6d6d6
| 121526 ||  || — || October 31, 1999 || Kitt Peak || Spacewatch || — || align=right | 4.7 km || 
|-id=527 bgcolor=#E9E9E9
| 121527 ||  || — || October 31, 1999 || Kitt Peak || Spacewatch || — || align=right | 4.8 km || 
|-id=528 bgcolor=#E9E9E9
| 121528 ||  || — || October 31, 1999 || Kitt Peak || Spacewatch || — || align=right | 3.5 km || 
|-id=529 bgcolor=#d6d6d6
| 121529 ||  || — || October 31, 1999 || Kitt Peak || Spacewatch || — || align=right | 3.8 km || 
|-id=530 bgcolor=#E9E9E9
| 121530 ||  || — || October 16, 1999 || Kitt Peak || Spacewatch || — || align=right | 3.0 km || 
|-id=531 bgcolor=#E9E9E9
| 121531 ||  || — || October 16, 1999 || Kitt Peak || Spacewatch || AGN || align=right | 1.9 km || 
|-id=532 bgcolor=#E9E9E9
| 121532 ||  || — || October 16, 1999 || Socorro || LINEAR || AER || align=right | 2.9 km || 
|-id=533 bgcolor=#d6d6d6
| 121533 ||  || — || October 16, 1999 || Socorro || LINEAR || BRA || align=right | 3.3 km || 
|-id=534 bgcolor=#E9E9E9
| 121534 ||  || — || October 18, 1999 || Kitt Peak || Spacewatch || slow || align=right | 3.6 km || 
|-id=535 bgcolor=#d6d6d6
| 121535 ||  || — || October 18, 1999 || Kitt Peak || Spacewatch || — || align=right | 3.9 km || 
|-id=536 bgcolor=#E9E9E9
| 121536 Brianburt ||  ||  || October 30, 1999 || Anderson Mesa || LONEOS || MAR || align=right | 3.2 km || 
|-id=537 bgcolor=#d6d6d6
| 121537 Lorenzdavid ||  ||  || October 30, 1999 || Catalina || CSS || — || align=right | 7.6 km || 
|-id=538 bgcolor=#d6d6d6
| 121538 ||  || — || October 31, 1999 || Catalina || CSS || — || align=right | 6.3 km || 
|-id=539 bgcolor=#E9E9E9
| 121539 ||  || — || October 30, 1999 || Catalina || CSS || — || align=right | 4.8 km || 
|-id=540 bgcolor=#E9E9E9
| 121540 Jamesmarsh ||  ||  || October 31, 1999 || Catalina || CSS || GEF || align=right | 3.2 km || 
|-id=541 bgcolor=#E9E9E9
| 121541 ||  || — || October 31, 1999 || Gnosca || S. Sposetti || — || align=right | 2.6 km || 
|-id=542 bgcolor=#d6d6d6
| 121542 Alindamashiku ||  ||  || October 29, 1999 || Catalina || CSS || EOS || align=right | 3.2 km || 
|-id=543 bgcolor=#d6d6d6
| 121543 ||  || — || November 3, 1999 || Baton Rouge || W. R. Cooney Jr., P. M. Motl || — || align=right | 5.2 km || 
|-id=544 bgcolor=#d6d6d6
| 121544 ||  || — || November 3, 1999 || Baton Rouge || W. R. Cooney Jr., P. M. Motl || — || align=right | 5.5 km || 
|-id=545 bgcolor=#d6d6d6
| 121545 ||  || — || November 1, 1999 || Kitt Peak || Spacewatch || — || align=right | 4.5 km || 
|-id=546 bgcolor=#d6d6d6
| 121546 ||  || — || November 5, 1999 || San Marcello || L. Tesi, A. Boattini || — || align=right | 5.1 km || 
|-id=547 bgcolor=#fefefe
| 121547 Fenghuotongxin ||  ||  || November 11, 1999 || Xinglong || SCAP || H || align=right | 1.2 km || 
|-id=548 bgcolor=#d6d6d6
| 121548 ||  || — || November 3, 1999 || Socorro || LINEAR || — || align=right | 5.7 km || 
|-id=549 bgcolor=#d6d6d6
| 121549 ||  || — || November 3, 1999 || Socorro || LINEAR || — || align=right | 2.7 km || 
|-id=550 bgcolor=#d6d6d6
| 121550 ||  || — || November 3, 1999 || Socorro || LINEAR || — || align=right | 4.2 km || 
|-id=551 bgcolor=#d6d6d6
| 121551 ||  || — || November 3, 1999 || Socorro || LINEAR || — || align=right | 4.6 km || 
|-id=552 bgcolor=#d6d6d6
| 121552 ||  || — || November 3, 1999 || Socorro || LINEAR || EOS || align=right | 4.4 km || 
|-id=553 bgcolor=#d6d6d6
| 121553 ||  || — || November 10, 1999 || Socorro || LINEAR || — || align=right | 3.0 km || 
|-id=554 bgcolor=#d6d6d6
| 121554 ||  || — || November 10, 1999 || Socorro || LINEAR || — || align=right | 4.5 km || 
|-id=555 bgcolor=#d6d6d6
| 121555 ||  || — || November 1, 1999 || Kitt Peak || Spacewatch || — || align=right | 3.8 km || 
|-id=556 bgcolor=#d6d6d6
| 121556 ||  || — || November 4, 1999 || Kitt Peak || Spacewatch || — || align=right | 4.6 km || 
|-id=557 bgcolor=#d6d6d6
| 121557 Paulmason ||  ||  || November 3, 1999 || Catalina || CSS || LIX || align=right | 6.2 km || 
|-id=558 bgcolor=#d6d6d6
| 121558 ||  || — || November 3, 1999 || Socorro || LINEAR || — || align=right | 6.2 km || 
|-id=559 bgcolor=#d6d6d6
| 121559 ||  || — || November 3, 1999 || Socorro || LINEAR || — || align=right | 4.6 km || 
|-id=560 bgcolor=#d6d6d6
| 121560 ||  || — || November 3, 1999 || Socorro || LINEAR || HYG || align=right | 4.3 km || 
|-id=561 bgcolor=#E9E9E9
| 121561 ||  || — || November 3, 1999 || Socorro || LINEAR || — || align=right | 6.3 km || 
|-id=562 bgcolor=#d6d6d6
| 121562 ||  || — || November 3, 1999 || Socorro || LINEAR || — || align=right | 5.4 km || 
|-id=563 bgcolor=#d6d6d6
| 121563 ||  || — || November 3, 1999 || Socorro || LINEAR || KOR || align=right | 3.3 km || 
|-id=564 bgcolor=#E9E9E9
| 121564 ||  || — || November 4, 1999 || Socorro || LINEAR || XIZ || align=right | 2.4 km || 
|-id=565 bgcolor=#E9E9E9
| 121565 ||  || — || November 4, 1999 || Socorro || LINEAR || — || align=right | 3.5 km || 
|-id=566 bgcolor=#d6d6d6
| 121566 ||  || — || November 4, 1999 || Socorro || LINEAR || — || align=right | 3.1 km || 
|-id=567 bgcolor=#d6d6d6
| 121567 ||  || — || November 4, 1999 || Socorro || LINEAR || — || align=right | 5.0 km || 
|-id=568 bgcolor=#d6d6d6
| 121568 ||  || — || November 4, 1999 || Socorro || LINEAR || — || align=right | 4.5 km || 
|-id=569 bgcolor=#d6d6d6
| 121569 ||  || — || November 4, 1999 || Socorro || LINEAR || KOR || align=right | 2.5 km || 
|-id=570 bgcolor=#d6d6d6
| 121570 ||  || — || November 5, 1999 || Kitt Peak || Spacewatch || — || align=right | 3.6 km || 
|-id=571 bgcolor=#d6d6d6
| 121571 ||  || — || November 5, 1999 || Kitt Peak || Spacewatch || THM || align=right | 4.6 km || 
|-id=572 bgcolor=#d6d6d6
| 121572 ||  || — || November 7, 1999 || Socorro || LINEAR || — || align=right | 4.8 km || 
|-id=573 bgcolor=#fefefe
| 121573 ||  || — || November 8, 1999 || Socorro || LINEAR || H || align=right | 1.5 km || 
|-id=574 bgcolor=#E9E9E9
| 121574 ||  || — || November 5, 1999 || Socorro || LINEAR || — || align=right | 3.1 km || 
|-id=575 bgcolor=#d6d6d6
| 121575 ||  || — || November 5, 1999 || Socorro || LINEAR || — || align=right | 4.0 km || 
|-id=576 bgcolor=#d6d6d6
| 121576 ||  || — || November 9, 1999 || Socorro || LINEAR || KOR || align=right | 2.7 km || 
|-id=577 bgcolor=#d6d6d6
| 121577 ||  || — || November 9, 1999 || Socorro || LINEAR || KOR || align=right | 2.3 km || 
|-id=578 bgcolor=#d6d6d6
| 121578 ||  || — || November 9, 1999 || Socorro || LINEAR || — || align=right | 6.1 km || 
|-id=579 bgcolor=#d6d6d6
| 121579 ||  || — || November 9, 1999 || Socorro || LINEAR || — || align=right | 4.3 km || 
|-id=580 bgcolor=#E9E9E9
| 121580 ||  || — || November 9, 1999 || Socorro || LINEAR || — || align=right | 5.0 km || 
|-id=581 bgcolor=#d6d6d6
| 121581 ||  || — || November 9, 1999 || Socorro || LINEAR || THM || align=right | 4.2 km || 
|-id=582 bgcolor=#d6d6d6
| 121582 ||  || — || November 9, 1999 || Socorro || LINEAR || — || align=right | 3.9 km || 
|-id=583 bgcolor=#E9E9E9
| 121583 ||  || — || November 9, 1999 || Socorro || LINEAR || HEN || align=right | 1.9 km || 
|-id=584 bgcolor=#d6d6d6
| 121584 ||  || — || November 9, 1999 || Socorro || LINEAR || — || align=right | 3.7 km || 
|-id=585 bgcolor=#d6d6d6
| 121585 ||  || — || November 9, 1999 || Socorro || LINEAR || — || align=right | 4.0 km || 
|-id=586 bgcolor=#d6d6d6
| 121586 ||  || — || November 9, 1999 || Socorro || LINEAR || THM || align=right | 4.4 km || 
|-id=587 bgcolor=#d6d6d6
| 121587 ||  || — || November 9, 1999 || Socorro || LINEAR || — || align=right | 3.9 km || 
|-id=588 bgcolor=#d6d6d6
| 121588 ||  || — || November 9, 1999 || Socorro || LINEAR || KOR || align=right | 2.8 km || 
|-id=589 bgcolor=#d6d6d6
| 121589 ||  || — || November 9, 1999 || Socorro || LINEAR || — || align=right | 3.3 km || 
|-id=590 bgcolor=#d6d6d6
| 121590 ||  || — || November 9, 1999 || Socorro || LINEAR || — || align=right | 5.7 km || 
|-id=591 bgcolor=#d6d6d6
| 121591 ||  || — || November 9, 1999 || Socorro || LINEAR || THM || align=right | 4.6 km || 
|-id=592 bgcolor=#d6d6d6
| 121592 ||  || — || November 9, 1999 || Socorro || LINEAR || — || align=right | 5.1 km || 
|-id=593 bgcolor=#d6d6d6
| 121593 Kevinmiller ||  ||  || November 9, 1999 || Catalina || CSS || — || align=right | 5.5 km || 
|-id=594 bgcolor=#d6d6d6
| 121594 Zubritsky ||  ||  || November 9, 1999 || Catalina || CSS || — || align=right | 6.5 km || 
|-id=595 bgcolor=#E9E9E9
| 121595 ||  || — || November 6, 1999 || Kitt Peak || Spacewatch || — || align=right | 5.8 km || 
|-id=596 bgcolor=#d6d6d6
| 121596 ||  || — || November 9, 1999 || Kitt Peak || Spacewatch || KOR || align=right | 1.8 km || 
|-id=597 bgcolor=#d6d6d6
| 121597 ||  || — || November 11, 1999 || Kitt Peak || Spacewatch || — || align=right | 4.1 km || 
|-id=598 bgcolor=#d6d6d6
| 121598 ||  || — || November 9, 1999 || Kitt Peak || Spacewatch || HYG || align=right | 5.4 km || 
|-id=599 bgcolor=#E9E9E9
| 121599 ||  || — || November 13, 1999 || Kitt Peak || Spacewatch || — || align=right | 2.1 km || 
|-id=600 bgcolor=#d6d6d6
| 121600 ||  || — || November 9, 1999 || Socorro || LINEAR || — || align=right | 4.7 km || 
|}

121601–121700 

|-bgcolor=#d6d6d6
| 121601 ||  || — || November 9, 1999 || Socorro || LINEAR || 7:4 || align=right | 6.3 km || 
|-id=602 bgcolor=#d6d6d6
| 121602 ||  || — || November 12, 1999 || Socorro || LINEAR || HYG || align=right | 5.1 km || 
|-id=603 bgcolor=#d6d6d6
| 121603 ||  || — || November 12, 1999 || Socorro || LINEAR || — || align=right | 5.1 km || 
|-id=604 bgcolor=#d6d6d6
| 121604 ||  || — || November 12, 1999 || Socorro || LINEAR || — || align=right | 4.1 km || 
|-id=605 bgcolor=#d6d6d6
| 121605 ||  || — || November 9, 1999 || Kitt Peak || Spacewatch || — || align=right | 6.2 km || 
|-id=606 bgcolor=#d6d6d6
| 121606 ||  || — || November 10, 1999 || Kitt Peak || Spacewatch || — || align=right | 3.7 km || 
|-id=607 bgcolor=#d6d6d6
| 121607 ||  || — || November 10, 1999 || Kitt Peak || Spacewatch || THM || align=right | 6.6 km || 
|-id=608 bgcolor=#d6d6d6
| 121608 Mikemoreau ||  ||  || November 11, 1999 || Catalina || CSS || — || align=right | 6.1 km || 
|-id=609 bgcolor=#d6d6d6
| 121609 Josephnicholas ||  ||  || November 13, 1999 || Catalina || CSS || TIR || align=right | 4.8 km || 
|-id=610 bgcolor=#d6d6d6
| 121610 ||  || — || November 14, 1999 || Socorro || LINEAR || EOS || align=right | 3.8 km || 
|-id=611 bgcolor=#d6d6d6
| 121611 ||  || — || November 14, 1999 || Socorro || LINEAR || — || align=right | 5.3 km || 
|-id=612 bgcolor=#d6d6d6
| 121612 ||  || — || November 14, 1999 || Socorro || LINEAR || — || align=right | 2.7 km || 
|-id=613 bgcolor=#d6d6d6
| 121613 ||  || — || November 14, 1999 || Socorro || LINEAR || — || align=right | 5.7 km || 
|-id=614 bgcolor=#d6d6d6
| 121614 ||  || — || November 11, 1999 || Kitt Peak || Spacewatch || — || align=right | 4.5 km || 
|-id=615 bgcolor=#d6d6d6
| 121615 Marknoteware ||  ||  || November 13, 1999 || Catalina || CSS || — || align=right | 6.1 km || 
|-id=616 bgcolor=#d6d6d6
| 121616 ||  || — || November 13, 1999 || Kitt Peak || Spacewatch || — || align=right | 3.8 km || 
|-id=617 bgcolor=#d6d6d6
| 121617 ||  || — || November 14, 1999 || Socorro || LINEAR || — || align=right | 5.1 km || 
|-id=618 bgcolor=#E9E9E9
| 121618 ||  || — || November 14, 1999 || Socorro || LINEAR || — || align=right | 4.0 km || 
|-id=619 bgcolor=#d6d6d6
| 121619 ||  || — || November 14, 1999 || Socorro || LINEAR || HYG || align=right | 4.7 km || 
|-id=620 bgcolor=#d6d6d6
| 121620 ||  || — || November 14, 1999 || Socorro || LINEAR || — || align=right | 4.4 km || 
|-id=621 bgcolor=#d6d6d6
| 121621 ||  || — || November 14, 1999 || Socorro || LINEAR || — || align=right | 6.3 km || 
|-id=622 bgcolor=#d6d6d6
| 121622 ||  || — || November 14, 1999 || Socorro || LINEAR || — || align=right | 4.6 km || 
|-id=623 bgcolor=#d6d6d6
| 121623 ||  || — || November 14, 1999 || Socorro || LINEAR || — || align=right | 4.4 km || 
|-id=624 bgcolor=#d6d6d6
| 121624 ||  || — || November 15, 1999 || Socorro || LINEAR || — || align=right | 4.7 km || 
|-id=625 bgcolor=#d6d6d6
| 121625 ||  || — || November 6, 1999 || Socorro || LINEAR || — || align=right | 5.7 km || 
|-id=626 bgcolor=#d6d6d6
| 121626 ||  || — || November 6, 1999 || Socorro || LINEAR || — || align=right | 4.6 km || 
|-id=627 bgcolor=#d6d6d6
| 121627 ||  || — || November 9, 1999 || Socorro || LINEAR || — || align=right | 4.8 km || 
|-id=628 bgcolor=#d6d6d6
| 121628 ||  || — || November 12, 1999 || Socorro || LINEAR || — || align=right | 3.5 km || 
|-id=629 bgcolor=#d6d6d6
| 121629 ||  || — || November 15, 1999 || Socorro || LINEAR || — || align=right | 4.5 km || 
|-id=630 bgcolor=#d6d6d6
| 121630 ||  || — || November 15, 1999 || Socorro || LINEAR || — || align=right | 3.4 km || 
|-id=631 bgcolor=#d6d6d6
| 121631 Josephnuth ||  ||  || November 1, 1999 || Catalina || CSS || — || align=right | 6.1 km || 
|-id=632 bgcolor=#E9E9E9
| 121632 ||  || — || November 1, 1999 || Catalina || CSS || — || align=right | 6.2 km || 
|-id=633 bgcolor=#d6d6d6
| 121633 Ronperison ||  ||  || November 3, 1999 || Catalina || CSS || — || align=right | 3.9 km || 
|-id=634 bgcolor=#d6d6d6
| 121634 ||  || — || November 4, 1999 || Anderson Mesa || LONEOS || — || align=right | 2.5 km || 
|-id=635 bgcolor=#d6d6d6
| 121635 ||  || — || November 3, 1999 || Socorro || LINEAR || LIX || align=right | 7.5 km || 
|-id=636 bgcolor=#d6d6d6
| 121636 ||  || — || November 12, 1999 || Socorro || LINEAR || — || align=right | 3.7 km || 
|-id=637 bgcolor=#d6d6d6
| 121637 Druscillaperry ||  ||  || November 13, 1999 || Catalina || CSS || HYG || align=right | 5.0 km || 
|-id=638 bgcolor=#d6d6d6
| 121638 ||  || — || November 3, 1999 || Socorro || LINEAR || — || align=right | 7.4 km || 
|-id=639 bgcolor=#d6d6d6
| 121639 ||  || — || November 5, 1999 || Socorro || LINEAR || THM || align=right | 4.3 km || 
|-id=640 bgcolor=#d6d6d6
| 121640 ||  || — || November 4, 1999 || Socorro || LINEAR || — || align=right | 4.8 km || 
|-id=641 bgcolor=#d6d6d6
| 121641 ||  || — || November 5, 1999 || Socorro || LINEAR || — || align=right | 5.7 km || 
|-id=642 bgcolor=#d6d6d6
| 121642 ||  || — || November 1, 1999 || Socorro || LINEAR || EUP || align=right | 7.6 km || 
|-id=643 bgcolor=#d6d6d6
| 121643 ||  || — || November 28, 1999 || Kleť || Kleť Obs. || TEL || align=right | 3.2 km || 
|-id=644 bgcolor=#d6d6d6
| 121644 ||  || — || November 28, 1999 || Višnjan Observatory || K. Korlević || — || align=right | 6.2 km || 
|-id=645 bgcolor=#d6d6d6
| 121645 ||  || — || November 28, 1999 || Višnjan Observatory || K. Korlević || — || align=right | 5.6 km || 
|-id=646 bgcolor=#d6d6d6
| 121646 ||  || — || November 27, 1999 || Monte Agliale || M. Ziboli || TIR || align=right | 5.7 km || 
|-id=647 bgcolor=#E9E9E9
| 121647 ||  || — || November 28, 1999 || Kitt Peak || Spacewatch || — || align=right | 4.1 km || 
|-id=648 bgcolor=#d6d6d6
| 121648 ||  || — || November 30, 1999 || Kitt Peak || Spacewatch || KOR || align=right | 2.3 km || 
|-id=649 bgcolor=#E9E9E9
| 121649 ||  || — || November 30, 1999 || Kitt Peak || Spacewatch || — || align=right | 3.8 km || 
|-id=650 bgcolor=#d6d6d6
| 121650 ||  || — || November 30, 1999 || Kitt Peak || Spacewatch || THM || align=right | 3.3 km || 
|-id=651 bgcolor=#d6d6d6
| 121651 ||  || — || November 30, 1999 || Kitt Peak || Spacewatch || — || align=right | 5.4 km || 
|-id=652 bgcolor=#d6d6d6
| 121652 ||  || — || November 30, 1999 || Kitt Peak || Spacewatch || K-2 || align=right | 2.2 km || 
|-id=653 bgcolor=#fefefe
| 121653 || 1999 XV || — || December 2, 1999 || Socorro || LINEAR || H || align=right | 1.4 km || 
|-id=654 bgcolor=#d6d6d6
| 121654 Michaelpryzby ||  ||  || December 4, 1999 || Catalina || CSS || HYG || align=right | 5.7 km || 
|-id=655 bgcolor=#d6d6d6
| 121655 Nitapszcolka ||  ||  || December 4, 1999 || Catalina || CSS || — || align=right | 4.4 km || 
|-id=656 bgcolor=#d6d6d6
| 121656 Jamesrogers ||  ||  || December 4, 1999 || Catalina || CSS || AEG || align=right | 9.1 km || 
|-id=657 bgcolor=#d6d6d6
| 121657 ||  || — || December 4, 1999 || Catalina || CSS || — || align=right | 5.1 km || 
|-id=658 bgcolor=#fefefe
| 121658 ||  || — || December 5, 1999 || Socorro || LINEAR || H || align=right | 1.2 km || 
|-id=659 bgcolor=#d6d6d6
| 121659 Blairrussell ||  ||  || December 5, 1999 || Catalina || CSS || TIR || align=right | 4.3 km || 
|-id=660 bgcolor=#fefefe
| 121660 ||  || — || December 5, 1999 || Socorro || LINEAR || H || align=right | 1.2 km || 
|-id=661 bgcolor=#d6d6d6
| 121661 ||  || — || December 5, 1999 || Socorro || LINEAR || — || align=right | 5.2 km || 
|-id=662 bgcolor=#d6d6d6
| 121662 ||  || — || December 6, 1999 || Socorro || LINEAR || — || align=right | 4.3 km || 
|-id=663 bgcolor=#d6d6d6
| 121663 ||  || — || December 6, 1999 || Socorro || LINEAR || — || align=right | 4.5 km || 
|-id=664 bgcolor=#d6d6d6
| 121664 ||  || — || December 3, 1999 || Uenohara || N. Kawasato || — || align=right | 3.9 km || 
|-id=665 bgcolor=#d6d6d6
| 121665 ||  || — || December 8, 1999 || Socorro || LINEAR || — || align=right | 5.7 km || 
|-id=666 bgcolor=#d6d6d6
| 121666 ||  || — || December 7, 1999 || Socorro || LINEAR || HYG || align=right | 4.7 km || 
|-id=667 bgcolor=#E9E9E9
| 121667 ||  || — || December 7, 1999 || Socorro || LINEAR || — || align=right | 4.1 km || 
|-id=668 bgcolor=#d6d6d6
| 121668 ||  || — || December 7, 1999 || Socorro || LINEAR || — || align=right | 4.8 km || 
|-id=669 bgcolor=#d6d6d6
| 121669 ||  || — || December 7, 1999 || Socorro || LINEAR || — || align=right | 4.3 km || 
|-id=670 bgcolor=#d6d6d6
| 121670 ||  || — || December 7, 1999 || Socorro || LINEAR || KOR || align=right | 3.3 km || 
|-id=671 bgcolor=#d6d6d6
| 121671 ||  || — || December 7, 1999 || Socorro || LINEAR || — || align=right | 4.5 km || 
|-id=672 bgcolor=#d6d6d6
| 121672 ||  || — || December 7, 1999 || Socorro || LINEAR || — || align=right | 4.6 km || 
|-id=673 bgcolor=#d6d6d6
| 121673 ||  || — || December 7, 1999 || Socorro || LINEAR || THM || align=right | 4.2 km || 
|-id=674 bgcolor=#d6d6d6
| 121674 ||  || — || December 7, 1999 || Socorro || LINEAR || — || align=right | 5.4 km || 
|-id=675 bgcolor=#d6d6d6
| 121675 ||  || — || December 7, 1999 || Socorro || LINEAR || — || align=right | 4.7 km || 
|-id=676 bgcolor=#d6d6d6
| 121676 ||  || — || December 7, 1999 || Socorro || LINEAR || EOS || align=right | 3.6 km || 
|-id=677 bgcolor=#d6d6d6
| 121677 ||  || — || December 7, 1999 || Socorro || LINEAR || — || align=right | 5.0 km || 
|-id=678 bgcolor=#d6d6d6
| 121678 ||  || — || December 7, 1999 || Socorro || LINEAR || — || align=right | 4.3 km || 
|-id=679 bgcolor=#fefefe
| 121679 ||  || — || December 7, 1999 || Socorro || LINEAR || — || align=right | 1.2 km || 
|-id=680 bgcolor=#d6d6d6
| 121680 ||  || — || December 7, 1999 || Socorro || LINEAR || THM || align=right | 3.2 km || 
|-id=681 bgcolor=#d6d6d6
| 121681 ||  || — || December 7, 1999 || Socorro || LINEAR || — || align=right | 7.0 km || 
|-id=682 bgcolor=#d6d6d6
| 121682 ||  || — || December 7, 1999 || Socorro || LINEAR || — || align=right | 6.1 km || 
|-id=683 bgcolor=#d6d6d6
| 121683 ||  || — || December 7, 1999 || Socorro || LINEAR || THM || align=right | 3.8 km || 
|-id=684 bgcolor=#d6d6d6
| 121684 ||  || — || December 7, 1999 || Socorro || LINEAR || — || align=right | 5.9 km || 
|-id=685 bgcolor=#d6d6d6
| 121685 ||  || — || December 7, 1999 || Socorro || LINEAR || HYG || align=right | 5.3 km || 
|-id=686 bgcolor=#d6d6d6
| 121686 ||  || — || December 7, 1999 || Socorro || LINEAR || THM || align=right | 3.3 km || 
|-id=687 bgcolor=#d6d6d6
| 121687 ||  || — || December 7, 1999 || Socorro || LINEAR || — || align=right | 4.6 km || 
|-id=688 bgcolor=#d6d6d6
| 121688 ||  || — || December 7, 1999 || Socorro || LINEAR || — || align=right | 4.5 km || 
|-id=689 bgcolor=#d6d6d6
| 121689 ||  || — || December 7, 1999 || Socorro || LINEAR || — || align=right | 6.5 km || 
|-id=690 bgcolor=#d6d6d6
| 121690 ||  || — || December 7, 1999 || Socorro || LINEAR || — || align=right | 5.2 km || 
|-id=691 bgcolor=#d6d6d6
| 121691 ||  || — || December 7, 1999 || Socorro || LINEAR || — || align=right | 4.8 km || 
|-id=692 bgcolor=#d6d6d6
| 121692 ||  || — || December 7, 1999 || Socorro || LINEAR || — || align=right | 3.9 km || 
|-id=693 bgcolor=#d6d6d6
| 121693 ||  || — || December 7, 1999 || Socorro || LINEAR || — || align=right | 5.1 km || 
|-id=694 bgcolor=#d6d6d6
| 121694 ||  || — || December 7, 1999 || Socorro || LINEAR || THM || align=right | 4.7 km || 
|-id=695 bgcolor=#d6d6d6
| 121695 ||  || — || December 7, 1999 || Socorro || LINEAR || — || align=right | 5.6 km || 
|-id=696 bgcolor=#d6d6d6
| 121696 ||  || — || December 7, 1999 || Socorro || LINEAR || HYG || align=right | 5.7 km || 
|-id=697 bgcolor=#d6d6d6
| 121697 ||  || — || December 7, 1999 || Socorro || LINEAR || — || align=right | 8.5 km || 
|-id=698 bgcolor=#d6d6d6
| 121698 ||  || — || December 7, 1999 || Socorro || LINEAR || EOS || align=right | 3.6 km || 
|-id=699 bgcolor=#d6d6d6
| 121699 ||  || — || December 7, 1999 || Socorro || LINEAR || — || align=right | 3.8 km || 
|-id=700 bgcolor=#d6d6d6
| 121700 ||  || — || December 7, 1999 || Socorro || LINEAR || EOS || align=right | 4.6 km || 
|}

121701–121800 

|-bgcolor=#d6d6d6
| 121701 ||  || — || December 7, 1999 || Socorro || LINEAR || HYG || align=right | 6.8 km || 
|-id=702 bgcolor=#d6d6d6
| 121702 ||  || — || December 7, 1999 || Socorro || LINEAR || KOR || align=right | 3.0 km || 
|-id=703 bgcolor=#d6d6d6
| 121703 ||  || — || December 7, 1999 || Socorro || LINEAR || — || align=right | 7.3 km || 
|-id=704 bgcolor=#d6d6d6
| 121704 ||  || — || December 7, 1999 || Socorro || LINEAR || HYG || align=right | 5.7 km || 
|-id=705 bgcolor=#d6d6d6
| 121705 ||  || — || December 7, 1999 || Socorro || LINEAR || — || align=right | 5.6 km || 
|-id=706 bgcolor=#d6d6d6
| 121706 ||  || — || December 9, 1999 || Prescott || P. G. Comba || LIX || align=right | 6.6 km || 
|-id=707 bgcolor=#d6d6d6
| 121707 ||  || — || December 7, 1999 || Socorro || LINEAR || — || align=right | 7.3 km || 
|-id=708 bgcolor=#d6d6d6
| 121708 ||  || — || December 7, 1999 || Socorro || LINEAR || — || align=right | 11 km || 
|-id=709 bgcolor=#d6d6d6
| 121709 ||  || — || December 11, 1999 || Prescott || P. G. Comba || EOS || align=right | 4.9 km || 
|-id=710 bgcolor=#d6d6d6
| 121710 ||  || — || December 7, 1999 || Socorro || LINEAR || LIX || align=right | 7.5 km || 
|-id=711 bgcolor=#d6d6d6
| 121711 ||  || — || December 11, 1999 || Socorro || LINEAR || — || align=right | 9.6 km || 
|-id=712 bgcolor=#d6d6d6
| 121712 ||  || — || December 11, 1999 || Socorro || LINEAR || TIR || align=right | 5.5 km || 
|-id=713 bgcolor=#d6d6d6
| 121713 ||  || — || December 11, 1999 || Socorro || LINEAR || — || align=right | 7.8 km || 
|-id=714 bgcolor=#d6d6d6
| 121714 ||  || — || December 5, 1999 || Catalina || CSS || — || align=right | 5.1 km || 
|-id=715 bgcolor=#d6d6d6
| 121715 Katiesalamy ||  ||  || December 5, 1999 || Catalina || CSS || HYG || align=right | 4.9 km || 
|-id=716 bgcolor=#d6d6d6
| 121716 Victorsank ||  ||  || December 7, 1999 || Catalina || CSS || — || align=right | 8.1 km || 
|-id=717 bgcolor=#d6d6d6
| 121717 Josephschepis ||  ||  || December 7, 1999 || Catalina || CSS || — || align=right | 5.3 km || 
|-id=718 bgcolor=#d6d6d6
| 121718 Ashleyscroggins ||  ||  || December 7, 1999 || Catalina || CSS || — || align=right | 6.4 km || 
|-id=719 bgcolor=#d6d6d6
| 121719 Georgeshaw ||  ||  || December 7, 1999 || Catalina || CSS || — || align=right | 4.9 km || 
|-id=720 bgcolor=#d6d6d6
| 121720 ||  || — || December 12, 1999 || Socorro || LINEAR || EOS || align=right | 5.6 km || 
|-id=721 bgcolor=#d6d6d6
| 121721 ||  || — || December 12, 1999 || Socorro || LINEAR || — || align=right | 6.0 km || 
|-id=722 bgcolor=#d6d6d6
| 121722 ||  || — || December 2, 1999 || Kitt Peak || Spacewatch || — || align=right | 5.2 km || 
|-id=723 bgcolor=#d6d6d6
| 121723 ||  || — || December 2, 1999 || Kitt Peak || Spacewatch || HYG || align=right | 5.8 km || 
|-id=724 bgcolor=#d6d6d6
| 121724 ||  || — || December 3, 1999 || Kitt Peak || Spacewatch || HYG || align=right | 5.1 km || 
|-id=725 bgcolor=#C7FF8F
| 121725 Aphidas ||  ||  || December 13, 1999 || Mount Hopkins || C. W. Hergenrother || centaurcritical || align=right | 73 km || 
|-id=726 bgcolor=#E9E9E9
| 121726 ||  || — || December 7, 1999 || Kitt Peak || Spacewatch || AGN || align=right | 2.0 km || 
|-id=727 bgcolor=#E9E9E9
| 121727 ||  || — || December 8, 1999 || Socorro || LINEAR || AGN || align=right | 2.7 km || 
|-id=728 bgcolor=#d6d6d6
| 121728 ||  || — || December 8, 1999 || Socorro || LINEAR || — || align=right | 5.9 km || 
|-id=729 bgcolor=#d6d6d6
| 121729 ||  || — || December 8, 1999 || Socorro || LINEAR || TIR || align=right | 5.5 km || 
|-id=730 bgcolor=#E9E9E9
| 121730 ||  || — || December 10, 1999 || Socorro || LINEAR || — || align=right | 2.2 km || 
|-id=731 bgcolor=#d6d6d6
| 121731 ||  || — || December 10, 1999 || Socorro || LINEAR || — || align=right | 7.8 km || 
|-id=732 bgcolor=#d6d6d6
| 121732 ||  || — || December 10, 1999 || Socorro || LINEAR || — || align=right | 7.1 km || 
|-id=733 bgcolor=#d6d6d6
| 121733 ||  || — || December 10, 1999 || Socorro || LINEAR || — || align=right | 9.1 km || 
|-id=734 bgcolor=#d6d6d6
| 121734 ||  || — || December 10, 1999 || Socorro || LINEAR || TIR || align=right | 6.5 km || 
|-id=735 bgcolor=#d6d6d6
| 121735 ||  || — || December 12, 1999 || Socorro || LINEAR || — || align=right | 7.5 km || 
|-id=736 bgcolor=#d6d6d6
| 121736 ||  || — || December 12, 1999 || Socorro || LINEAR || — || align=right | 7.5 km || 
|-id=737 bgcolor=#d6d6d6
| 121737 ||  || — || December 12, 1999 || Socorro || LINEAR || — || align=right | 5.2 km || 
|-id=738 bgcolor=#d6d6d6
| 121738 ||  || — || December 12, 1999 || Socorro || LINEAR || MEL || align=right | 7.4 km || 
|-id=739 bgcolor=#d6d6d6
| 121739 ||  || — || December 12, 1999 || Socorro || LINEAR || LIX || align=right | 6.2 km || 
|-id=740 bgcolor=#d6d6d6
| 121740 ||  || — || December 12, 1999 || Socorro || LINEAR || — || align=right | 5.4 km || 
|-id=741 bgcolor=#d6d6d6
| 121741 ||  || — || December 12, 1999 || Socorro || LINEAR || — || align=right | 5.7 km || 
|-id=742 bgcolor=#d6d6d6
| 121742 ||  || — || December 12, 1999 || Socorro || LINEAR || TIR || align=right | 5.3 km || 
|-id=743 bgcolor=#d6d6d6
| 121743 ||  || — || December 12, 1999 || Socorro || LINEAR || — || align=right | 6.9 km || 
|-id=744 bgcolor=#d6d6d6
| 121744 ||  || — || December 12, 1999 || Socorro || LINEAR || Tj (2.9) || align=right | 9.0 km || 
|-id=745 bgcolor=#FA8072
| 121745 ||  || — || December 12, 1999 || Socorro || LINEAR || PHO || align=right | 2.5 km || 
|-id=746 bgcolor=#d6d6d6
| 121746 ||  || — || December 12, 1999 || Socorro || LINEAR || 7:4 || align=right | 8.0 km || 
|-id=747 bgcolor=#d6d6d6
| 121747 ||  || — || December 13, 1999 || Socorro || LINEAR || — || align=right | 5.6 km || 
|-id=748 bgcolor=#d6d6d6
| 121748 ||  || — || December 13, 1999 || Socorro || LINEAR || TIR || align=right | 4.9 km || 
|-id=749 bgcolor=#d6d6d6
| 121749 ||  || — || December 13, 1999 || Kitt Peak || Spacewatch || — || align=right | 5.2 km || 
|-id=750 bgcolor=#d6d6d6
| 121750 ||  || — || December 15, 1999 || Socorro || LINEAR || — || align=right | 5.7 km || 
|-id=751 bgcolor=#d6d6d6
| 121751 ||  || — || December 14, 1999 || Kitt Peak || Spacewatch || THM || align=right | 4.9 km || 
|-id=752 bgcolor=#d6d6d6
| 121752 ||  || — || December 3, 1999 || Anderson Mesa || LONEOS || — || align=right | 5.4 km || 
|-id=753 bgcolor=#d6d6d6
| 121753 ||  || — || December 6, 1999 || Socorro || LINEAR || — || align=right | 5.6 km || 
|-id=754 bgcolor=#d6d6d6
| 121754 ||  || — || December 12, 1999 || Kitt Peak || Spacewatch || — || align=right | 5.3 km || 
|-id=755 bgcolor=#d6d6d6
| 121755 ||  || — || December 12, 1999 || Kitt Peak || Spacewatch || — || align=right | 3.6 km || 
|-id=756 bgcolor=#d6d6d6
| 121756 Sotomejias ||  ||  || December 7, 1999 || Catalina || CSS || — || align=right | 3.1 km || 
|-id=757 bgcolor=#d6d6d6
| 121757 ||  || — || December 16, 1999 || Kitt Peak || Spacewatch || KOR || align=right | 2.3 km || 
|-id=758 bgcolor=#d6d6d6
| 121758 ||  || — || December 19, 1999 || Socorro || LINEAR || Tj (2.99) || align=right | 7.6 km || 
|-id=759 bgcolor=#d6d6d6
| 121759 ||  || — || December 19, 1999 || Socorro || LINEAR || EUP || align=right | 7.8 km || 
|-id=760 bgcolor=#d6d6d6
| 121760 ||  || — || December 28, 1999 || Prescott || P. G. Comba || — || align=right | 5.7 km || 
|-id=761 bgcolor=#d6d6d6
| 121761 ||  || — || December 30, 1999 || Socorro || LINEAR || — || align=right | 7.7 km || 
|-id=762 bgcolor=#d6d6d6
| 121762 ||  || — || December 30, 1999 || Prescott || P. G. Comba || EOS || align=right | 3.7 km || 
|-id=763 bgcolor=#d6d6d6
| 121763 ||  || — || December 27, 1999 || Kitt Peak || Spacewatch || HYG || align=right | 5.9 km || 
|-id=764 bgcolor=#d6d6d6
| 121764 ||  || — || December 31, 1999 || Farpoint || G. Hug, G. Bell || HYG || align=right | 3.9 km || 
|-id=765 bgcolor=#d6d6d6
| 121765 ||  || — || December 31, 1999 || Kitt Peak || Spacewatch || HYG || align=right | 5.6 km || 
|-id=766 bgcolor=#d6d6d6
| 121766 ||  || — || December 31, 1999 || Kitt Peak || Spacewatch || — || align=right | 4.3 km || 
|-id=767 bgcolor=#d6d6d6
| 121767 ||  || — || December 31, 1999 || Kitt Peak || Spacewatch || KOR || align=right | 2.2 km || 
|-id=768 bgcolor=#d6d6d6
| 121768 ||  || — || December 31, 1999 || Kitt Peak || Spacewatch || THM || align=right | 3.8 km || 
|-id=769 bgcolor=#d6d6d6
| 121769 ||  || — || December 31, 1999 || Anderson Mesa || LONEOS || TIR || align=right | 4.8 km || 
|-id=770 bgcolor=#d6d6d6
| 121770 ||  || — || January 1, 2000 || San Marcello || A. Boattini, G. Forti || ALA || align=right | 7.5 km || 
|-id=771 bgcolor=#d6d6d6
| 121771 ||  || — || January 2, 2000 || Socorro || LINEAR || — || align=right | 6.2 km || 
|-id=772 bgcolor=#fefefe
| 121772 ||  || — || January 3, 2000 || Socorro || LINEAR || — || align=right | 1.7 km || 
|-id=773 bgcolor=#d6d6d6
| 121773 ||  || — || January 3, 2000 || Socorro || LINEAR || HYG || align=right | 6.1 km || 
|-id=774 bgcolor=#d6d6d6
| 121774 ||  || — || January 3, 2000 || Socorro || LINEAR || — || align=right | 4.5 km || 
|-id=775 bgcolor=#d6d6d6
| 121775 ||  || — || January 3, 2000 || Socorro || LINEAR || HYG || align=right | 6.1 km || 
|-id=776 bgcolor=#d6d6d6
| 121776 ||  || — || January 3, 2000 || Socorro || LINEAR || — || align=right | 9.2 km || 
|-id=777 bgcolor=#d6d6d6
| 121777 ||  || — || January 3, 2000 || Socorro || LINEAR || — || align=right | 7.6 km || 
|-id=778 bgcolor=#d6d6d6
| 121778 ||  || — || January 3, 2000 || Socorro || LINEAR || — || align=right | 5.4 km || 
|-id=779 bgcolor=#fefefe
| 121779 ||  || — || January 3, 2000 || Socorro || LINEAR || — || align=right | 1.5 km || 
|-id=780 bgcolor=#d6d6d6
| 121780 ||  || — || January 3, 2000 || Socorro || LINEAR || — || align=right | 6.8 km || 
|-id=781 bgcolor=#d6d6d6
| 121781 ||  || — || January 4, 2000 || Socorro || LINEAR || HYG || align=right | 6.3 km || 
|-id=782 bgcolor=#d6d6d6
| 121782 ||  || — || January 4, 2000 || Socorro || LINEAR || — || align=right | 7.9 km || 
|-id=783 bgcolor=#d6d6d6
| 121783 ||  || — || January 5, 2000 || Socorro || LINEAR || — || align=right | 6.1 km || 
|-id=784 bgcolor=#d6d6d6
| 121784 ||  || — || January 5, 2000 || Socorro || LINEAR || — || align=right | 7.2 km || 
|-id=785 bgcolor=#d6d6d6
| 121785 ||  || — || January 5, 2000 || Socorro || LINEAR || — || align=right | 7.2 km || 
|-id=786 bgcolor=#d6d6d6
| 121786 ||  || — || January 5, 2000 || Socorro || LINEAR || EUP || align=right | 7.0 km || 
|-id=787 bgcolor=#E9E9E9
| 121787 ||  || — || January 5, 2000 || Socorro || LINEAR || — || align=right | 2.2 km || 
|-id=788 bgcolor=#d6d6d6
| 121788 ||  || — || January 5, 2000 || Socorro || LINEAR || — || align=right | 6.9 km || 
|-id=789 bgcolor=#d6d6d6
| 121789 ||  || — || January 5, 2000 || Socorro || LINEAR || — || align=right | 6.6 km || 
|-id=790 bgcolor=#d6d6d6
| 121790 ||  || — || January 5, 2000 || Socorro || LINEAR || — || align=right | 5.8 km || 
|-id=791 bgcolor=#d6d6d6
| 121791 ||  || — || January 5, 2000 || Socorro || LINEAR || — || align=right | 8.3 km || 
|-id=792 bgcolor=#E9E9E9
| 121792 ||  || — || January 5, 2000 || Socorro || LINEAR || — || align=right | 1.7 km || 
|-id=793 bgcolor=#d6d6d6
| 121793 ||  || — || January 5, 2000 || Socorro || LINEAR || — || align=right | 6.9 km || 
|-id=794 bgcolor=#d6d6d6
| 121794 ||  || — || January 5, 2000 || Socorro || LINEAR || — || align=right | 7.5 km || 
|-id=795 bgcolor=#d6d6d6
| 121795 ||  || — || January 5, 2000 || Socorro || LINEAR || — || align=right | 7.4 km || 
|-id=796 bgcolor=#d6d6d6
| 121796 ||  || — || January 3, 2000 || Socorro || LINEAR || TIR || align=right | 4.6 km || 
|-id=797 bgcolor=#d6d6d6
| 121797 ||  || — || January 8, 2000 || Socorro || LINEAR || — || align=right | 7.1 km || 
|-id=798 bgcolor=#d6d6d6
| 121798 ||  || — || January 3, 2000 || Socorro || LINEAR || VER || align=right | 5.6 km || 
|-id=799 bgcolor=#d6d6d6
| 121799 ||  || — || January 3, 2000 || Socorro || LINEAR || — || align=right | 5.3 km || 
|-id=800 bgcolor=#d6d6d6
| 121800 ||  || — || January 3, 2000 || Socorro || LINEAR || — || align=right | 7.1 km || 
|}

121801–121900 

|-bgcolor=#d6d6d6
| 121801 ||  || — || January 3, 2000 || Socorro || LINEAR || — || align=right | 5.2 km || 
|-id=802 bgcolor=#fefefe
| 121802 ||  || — || January 4, 2000 || Socorro || LINEAR || — || align=right | 1.6 km || 
|-id=803 bgcolor=#d6d6d6
| 121803 ||  || — || January 8, 2000 || Socorro || LINEAR || — || align=right | 6.4 km || 
|-id=804 bgcolor=#d6d6d6
| 121804 ||  || — || January 13, 2000 || Kleť || Kleť Obs. || HYG || align=right | 4.5 km || 
|-id=805 bgcolor=#fefefe
| 121805 ||  || — || January 12, 2000 || Prescott || P. G. Comba || — || align=right | 1.5 km || 
|-id=806 bgcolor=#d6d6d6
| 121806 ||  || — || January 8, 2000 || Socorro || LINEAR || — || align=right | 7.0 km || 
|-id=807 bgcolor=#d6d6d6
| 121807 ||  || — || January 8, 2000 || Socorro || LINEAR || THB || align=right | 5.8 km || 
|-id=808 bgcolor=#d6d6d6
| 121808 ||  || — || January 8, 2000 || Socorro || LINEAR || AEG || align=right | 7.7 km || 
|-id=809 bgcolor=#d6d6d6
| 121809 ||  || — || January 8, 2000 || Socorro || LINEAR || MEL || align=right | 6.5 km || 
|-id=810 bgcolor=#d6d6d6
| 121810 ||  || — || January 7, 2000 || Kitt Peak || Spacewatch || EMA || align=right | 9.7 km || 
|-id=811 bgcolor=#fefefe
| 121811 ||  || — || January 8, 2000 || Kitt Peak || Spacewatch || FLO || align=right data-sort-value="0.97" | 970 m || 
|-id=812 bgcolor=#d6d6d6
| 121812 ||  || — || January 9, 2000 || Kitt Peak || Spacewatch || ALA || align=right | 7.5 km || 
|-id=813 bgcolor=#d6d6d6
| 121813 ||  || — || January 9, 2000 || Kitt Peak || Spacewatch || HYG || align=right | 4.9 km || 
|-id=814 bgcolor=#d6d6d6
| 121814 ||  || — || January 4, 2000 || Socorro || LINEAR || — || align=right | 6.9 km || 
|-id=815 bgcolor=#d6d6d6
| 121815 ||  || — || January 4, 2000 || Socorro || LINEAR || — || align=right | 4.5 km || 
|-id=816 bgcolor=#d6d6d6
| 121816 ||  || — || January 6, 2000 || Socorro || LINEAR || — || align=right | 6.1 km || 
|-id=817 bgcolor=#d6d6d6
| 121817 Szatmáry ||  ||  || January 2, 2000 || Piszkéstető || K. Sárneczky, L. Kiss || — || align=right | 5.5 km || 
|-id=818 bgcolor=#fefefe
| 121818 ||  || — || January 2, 2000 || Kitt Peak || Spacewatch || H || align=right data-sort-value="0.84" | 840 m || 
|-id=819 bgcolor=#d6d6d6
| 121819 ||  || — || January 2, 2000 || Socorro || LINEAR || — || align=right | 4.7 km || 
|-id=820 bgcolor=#d6d6d6
| 121820 ||  || — || January 3, 2000 || Socorro || LINEAR || THM || align=right | 4.0 km || 
|-id=821 bgcolor=#d6d6d6
| 121821 ||  || — || January 5, 2000 || Socorro || LINEAR || KOR || align=right | 3.0 km || 
|-id=822 bgcolor=#d6d6d6
| 121822 || 2000 BT || — || January 26, 2000 || Farra d'Isonzo || Farra d'Isonzo || — || align=right | 8.1 km || 
|-id=823 bgcolor=#fefefe
| 121823 ||  || — || January 28, 2000 || Socorro || LINEAR || H || align=right | 1.5 km || 
|-id=824 bgcolor=#d6d6d6
| 121824 ||  || — || January 26, 2000 || Kitt Peak || Spacewatch || 7:4 || align=right | 5.5 km || 
|-id=825 bgcolor=#fefefe
| 121825 ||  || — || January 26, 2000 || Kitt Peak || Spacewatch || — || align=right data-sort-value="0.98" | 980 m || 
|-id=826 bgcolor=#d6d6d6
| 121826 ||  || — || January 26, 2000 || Kitt Peak || Spacewatch || — || align=right | 4.6 km || 
|-id=827 bgcolor=#d6d6d6
| 121827 ||  || — || January 28, 2000 || Kitt Peak || Spacewatch || — || align=right | 5.2 km || 
|-id=828 bgcolor=#d6d6d6
| 121828 ||  || — || January 29, 2000 || Kitt Peak || Spacewatch || THM || align=right | 4.5 km || 
|-id=829 bgcolor=#fefefe
| 121829 ||  || — || January 29, 2000 || Socorro || LINEAR || FLO || align=right | 1.3 km || 
|-id=830 bgcolor=#d6d6d6
| 121830 ||  || — || January 26, 2000 || Kitt Peak || Spacewatch || THM || align=right | 4.2 km || 
|-id=831 bgcolor=#d6d6d6
| 121831 ||  || — || January 28, 2000 || Kitt Peak || Spacewatch || LUT || align=right | 7.8 km || 
|-id=832 bgcolor=#d6d6d6
| 121832 ||  || — || January 29, 2000 || Kitt Peak || Spacewatch || THM || align=right | 5.1 km || 
|-id=833 bgcolor=#d6d6d6
| 121833 ||  || — || January 27, 2000 || Socorro || LINEAR || — || align=right | 5.3 km || 
|-id=834 bgcolor=#d6d6d6
| 121834 ||  || — || January 30, 2000 || Socorro || LINEAR || — || align=right | 6.9 km || 
|-id=835 bgcolor=#d6d6d6
| 121835 ||  || — || January 30, 2000 || Socorro || LINEAR || — || align=right | 4.3 km || 
|-id=836 bgcolor=#d6d6d6
| 121836 ||  || — || January 30, 2000 || Socorro || LINEAR || — || align=right | 5.5 km || 
|-id=837 bgcolor=#fefefe
| 121837 ||  || — || January 30, 2000 || Socorro || LINEAR || — || align=right | 1.6 km || 
|-id=838 bgcolor=#d6d6d6
| 121838 ||  || — || January 28, 2000 || Kitt Peak || Spacewatch || HYG || align=right | 5.9 km || 
|-id=839 bgcolor=#d6d6d6
| 121839 ||  || — || January 30, 2000 || Kitt Peak || Spacewatch || EOS || align=right | 4.1 km || 
|-id=840 bgcolor=#d6d6d6
| 121840 ||  || — || January 28, 2000 || Kitt Peak || Spacewatch || — || align=right | 4.7 km || 
|-id=841 bgcolor=#d6d6d6
| 121841 ||  || — || January 16, 2000 || Kitt Peak || Spacewatch || — || align=right | 5.4 km || 
|-id=842 bgcolor=#fefefe
| 121842 ||  || — || February 2, 2000 || Socorro || LINEAR || H || align=right | 1.3 km || 
|-id=843 bgcolor=#d6d6d6
| 121843 ||  || — || February 2, 2000 || Socorro || LINEAR || — || align=right | 7.0 km || 
|-id=844 bgcolor=#d6d6d6
| 121844 ||  || — || February 2, 2000 || Socorro || LINEAR || HYG || align=right | 5.4 km || 
|-id=845 bgcolor=#d6d6d6
| 121845 ||  || — || February 2, 2000 || Socorro || LINEAR || — || align=right | 4.4 km || 
|-id=846 bgcolor=#fefefe
| 121846 ||  || — || February 2, 2000 || Socorro || LINEAR || — || align=right | 1.6 km || 
|-id=847 bgcolor=#d6d6d6
| 121847 ||  || — || February 2, 2000 || Socorro || LINEAR || URS || align=right | 7.2 km || 
|-id=848 bgcolor=#fefefe
| 121848 ||  || — || February 2, 2000 || Socorro || LINEAR || — || align=right | 1.8 km || 
|-id=849 bgcolor=#d6d6d6
| 121849 ||  || — || February 2, 2000 || Socorro || LINEAR || — || align=right | 5.7 km || 
|-id=850 bgcolor=#fefefe
| 121850 ||  || — || February 2, 2000 || Socorro || LINEAR || — || align=right | 2.2 km || 
|-id=851 bgcolor=#fefefe
| 121851 ||  || — || February 2, 2000 || Socorro || LINEAR || — || align=right | 1.8 km || 
|-id=852 bgcolor=#d6d6d6
| 121852 ||  || — || February 2, 2000 || Socorro || LINEAR || — || align=right | 7.3 km || 
|-id=853 bgcolor=#d6d6d6
| 121853 ||  || — || February 3, 2000 || Tebbutt || F. B. Zoltowski || — || align=right | 6.0 km || 
|-id=854 bgcolor=#d6d6d6
| 121854 ||  || — || February 2, 2000 || Socorro || LINEAR || — || align=right | 6.5 km || 
|-id=855 bgcolor=#fefefe
| 121855 ||  || — || February 2, 2000 || Socorro || LINEAR || — || align=right | 2.1 km || 
|-id=856 bgcolor=#d6d6d6
| 121856 ||  || — || February 3, 2000 || Socorro || LINEAR || — || align=right | 6.0 km || 
|-id=857 bgcolor=#d6d6d6
| 121857 ||  || — || February 3, 2000 || Socorro || LINEAR || — || align=right | 5.9 km || 
|-id=858 bgcolor=#d6d6d6
| 121858 ||  || — || February 3, 2000 || Socorro || LINEAR || — || align=right | 5.8 km || 
|-id=859 bgcolor=#d6d6d6
| 121859 ||  || — || February 6, 2000 || Socorro || LINEAR || HYG || align=right | 5.6 km || 
|-id=860 bgcolor=#fefefe
| 121860 ||  || — || February 6, 2000 || Socorro || LINEAR || — || align=right | 1.8 km || 
|-id=861 bgcolor=#d6d6d6
| 121861 ||  || — || February 1, 2000 || Kitt Peak || Spacewatch || THM || align=right | 3.9 km || 
|-id=862 bgcolor=#d6d6d6
| 121862 ||  || — || February 2, 2000 || Socorro || LINEAR || EOS || align=right | 3.8 km || 
|-id=863 bgcolor=#FA8072
| 121863 ||  || — || February 6, 2000 || Socorro || LINEAR || — || align=right | 1.7 km || 
|-id=864 bgcolor=#d6d6d6
| 121864 ||  || — || February 9, 2000 || Višnjan Observatory || K. Korlević || — || align=right | 4.2 km || 
|-id=865 bgcolor=#fefefe
| 121865 Dauvergne ||  ||  || February 10, 2000 || La Silla || F. Colas, C. Cavadore || ERI || align=right | 3.1 km || 
|-id=866 bgcolor=#d6d6d6
| 121866 ||  || — || February 4, 2000 || Socorro || LINEAR || — || align=right | 5.4 km || 
|-id=867 bgcolor=#fefefe
| 121867 ||  || — || February 4, 2000 || Socorro || LINEAR || — || align=right | 2.3 km || 
|-id=868 bgcolor=#fefefe
| 121868 ||  || — || February 6, 2000 || Socorro || LINEAR || — || align=right | 1.5 km || 
|-id=869 bgcolor=#d6d6d6
| 121869 ||  || — || February 6, 2000 || Socorro || LINEAR || — || align=right | 6.1 km || 
|-id=870 bgcolor=#d6d6d6
| 121870 ||  || — || February 7, 2000 || Kitt Peak || Spacewatch || HYG || align=right | 5.3 km || 
|-id=871 bgcolor=#d6d6d6
| 121871 ||  || — || February 8, 2000 || Kitt Peak || Spacewatch || THM || align=right | 3.4 km || 
|-id=872 bgcolor=#d6d6d6
| 121872 ||  || — || February 10, 2000 || Kitt Peak || Spacewatch || — || align=right | 6.4 km || 
|-id=873 bgcolor=#d6d6d6
| 121873 ||  || — || February 12, 2000 || Kitt Peak || Spacewatch || THM || align=right | 3.9 km || 
|-id=874 bgcolor=#fefefe
| 121874 ||  || — || February 3, 2000 || Socorro || LINEAR || — || align=right | 1.2 km || 
|-id=875 bgcolor=#d6d6d6
| 121875 ||  || — || February 3, 2000 || Socorro || LINEAR || — || align=right | 6.7 km || 
|-id=876 bgcolor=#d6d6d6
| 121876 ||  || — || February 2, 2000 || Socorro || LINEAR || — || align=right | 6.4 km || 
|-id=877 bgcolor=#fefefe
| 121877 ||  || — || February 2, 2000 || Socorro || LINEAR || — || align=right | 1.7 km || 
|-id=878 bgcolor=#d6d6d6
| 121878 ||  || — || February 3, 2000 || Socorro || LINEAR || THM || align=right | 4.8 km || 
|-id=879 bgcolor=#fefefe
| 121879 ||  || — || February 3, 2000 || Kitt Peak || Spacewatch || NYS || align=right | 1.3 km || 
|-id=880 bgcolor=#fefefe
| 121880 ||  || — || February 4, 2000 || Kitt Peak || Spacewatch || — || align=right | 1.4 km || 
|-id=881 bgcolor=#d6d6d6
| 121881 ||  || — || February 25, 2000 || Socorro || LINEAR || — || align=right | 8.0 km || 
|-id=882 bgcolor=#fefefe
| 121882 ||  || — || February 26, 2000 || Kitt Peak || Spacewatch || — || align=right | 1.00 km || 
|-id=883 bgcolor=#d6d6d6
| 121883 ||  || — || February 26, 2000 || Kitt Peak || Spacewatch || — || align=right | 5.5 km || 
|-id=884 bgcolor=#d6d6d6
| 121884 ||  || — || February 27, 2000 || Oizumi || T. Kobayashi || — || align=right | 5.0 km || 
|-id=885 bgcolor=#d6d6d6
| 121885 ||  || — || February 28, 2000 || Socorro || LINEAR || 7:4 || align=right | 8.1 km || 
|-id=886 bgcolor=#fefefe
| 121886 ||  || — || February 26, 2000 || Kitt Peak || Spacewatch || — || align=right | 1.5 km || 
|-id=887 bgcolor=#fefefe
| 121887 ||  || — || February 27, 2000 || Kitt Peak || Spacewatch || — || align=right | 1.1 km || 
|-id=888 bgcolor=#fefefe
| 121888 ||  || — || February 27, 2000 || Kitt Peak || Spacewatch || — || align=right | 1.0 km || 
|-id=889 bgcolor=#fefefe
| 121889 ||  || — || February 29, 2000 || Socorro || LINEAR || — || align=right | 1.0 km || 
|-id=890 bgcolor=#d6d6d6
| 121890 ||  || — || February 29, 2000 || Socorro || LINEAR || MEL || align=right | 7.8 km || 
|-id=891 bgcolor=#d6d6d6
| 121891 ||  || — || February 29, 2000 || Socorro || LINEAR || VER || align=right | 5.8 km || 
|-id=892 bgcolor=#fefefe
| 121892 ||  || — || February 29, 2000 || Socorro || LINEAR || NYS || align=right | 1.1 km || 
|-id=893 bgcolor=#d6d6d6
| 121893 ||  || — || February 29, 2000 || Socorro || LINEAR || — || align=right | 7.9 km || 
|-id=894 bgcolor=#d6d6d6
| 121894 ||  || — || February 29, 2000 || Socorro || LINEAR || HYG || align=right | 5.1 km || 
|-id=895 bgcolor=#d6d6d6
| 121895 ||  || — || February 29, 2000 || Socorro || LINEAR || — || align=right | 7.6 km || 
|-id=896 bgcolor=#fefefe
| 121896 ||  || — || February 29, 2000 || Socorro || LINEAR || — || align=right | 1.6 km || 
|-id=897 bgcolor=#fefefe
| 121897 ||  || — || February 29, 2000 || Socorro || LINEAR || MAS || align=right | 1.5 km || 
|-id=898 bgcolor=#fefefe
| 121898 ||  || — || February 29, 2000 || Socorro || LINEAR || FLO || align=right | 1.3 km || 
|-id=899 bgcolor=#d6d6d6
| 121899 ||  || — || February 29, 2000 || Socorro || LINEAR || — || align=right | 5.5 km || 
|-id=900 bgcolor=#d6d6d6
| 121900 ||  || — || February 29, 2000 || Socorro || LINEAR || THM || align=right | 4.3 km || 
|}

121901–122000 

|-bgcolor=#d6d6d6
| 121901 ||  || — || February 29, 2000 || Socorro || LINEAR || SYL7:4 || align=right | 8.7 km || 
|-id=902 bgcolor=#fefefe
| 121902 ||  || — || February 29, 2000 || Socorro || LINEAR || — || align=right | 1.8 km || 
|-id=903 bgcolor=#fefefe
| 121903 ||  || — || February 29, 2000 || Socorro || LINEAR || — || align=right | 1.4 km || 
|-id=904 bgcolor=#d6d6d6
| 121904 ||  || — || February 29, 2000 || Socorro || LINEAR || THM || align=right | 6.3 km || 
|-id=905 bgcolor=#fefefe
| 121905 ||  || — || February 29, 2000 || Socorro || LINEAR || — || align=right | 1.6 km || 
|-id=906 bgcolor=#d6d6d6
| 121906 ||  || — || February 29, 2000 || Socorro || LINEAR || — || align=right | 4.9 km || 
|-id=907 bgcolor=#d6d6d6
| 121907 ||  || — || February 29, 2000 || Socorro || LINEAR || THM || align=right | 5.0 km || 
|-id=908 bgcolor=#d6d6d6
| 121908 ||  || — || February 29, 2000 || Socorro || LINEAR || — || align=right | 6.4 km || 
|-id=909 bgcolor=#fefefe
| 121909 ||  || — || February 29, 2000 || Socorro || LINEAR || NYS || align=right | 1.0 km || 
|-id=910 bgcolor=#fefefe
| 121910 ||  || — || February 29, 2000 || Socorro || LINEAR || — || align=right | 1.6 km || 
|-id=911 bgcolor=#d6d6d6
| 121911 ||  || — || February 29, 2000 || Socorro || LINEAR || — || align=right | 5.2 km || 
|-id=912 bgcolor=#fefefe
| 121912 ||  || — || February 29, 2000 || Socorro || LINEAR || NYS || align=right | 1.1 km || 
|-id=913 bgcolor=#fefefe
| 121913 ||  || — || February 29, 2000 || Socorro || LINEAR || — || align=right | 1.4 km || 
|-id=914 bgcolor=#d6d6d6
| 121914 ||  || — || February 29, 2000 || Socorro || LINEAR || — || align=right | 6.9 km || 
|-id=915 bgcolor=#fefefe
| 121915 ||  || — || February 29, 2000 || Socorro || LINEAR || FLO || align=right | 2.0 km || 
|-id=916 bgcolor=#fefefe
| 121916 ||  || — || February 29, 2000 || Socorro || LINEAR || — || align=right | 2.2 km || 
|-id=917 bgcolor=#d6d6d6
| 121917 ||  || — || February 28, 2000 || Socorro || LINEAR || — || align=right | 6.0 km || 
|-id=918 bgcolor=#d6d6d6
| 121918 ||  || — || February 28, 2000 || Socorro || LINEAR || — || align=right | 7.2 km || 
|-id=919 bgcolor=#d6d6d6
| 121919 ||  || — || February 29, 2000 || Socorro || LINEAR || VER || align=right | 5.7 km || 
|-id=920 bgcolor=#fefefe
| 121920 ||  || — || February 29, 2000 || Socorro || LINEAR || — || align=right | 1.2 km || 
|-id=921 bgcolor=#fefefe
| 121921 ||  || — || February 26, 2000 || Kitt Peak || Spacewatch || — || align=right | 2.2 km || 
|-id=922 bgcolor=#fefefe
| 121922 ||  || — || February 27, 2000 || Kitt Peak || Spacewatch || — || align=right | 1.2 km || 
|-id=923 bgcolor=#d6d6d6
| 121923 ||  || — || February 29, 2000 || Socorro || LINEAR || HYG || align=right | 7.1 km || 
|-id=924 bgcolor=#fefefe
| 121924 ||  || — || February 29, 2000 || Socorro || LINEAR || — || align=right | 1.3 km || 
|-id=925 bgcolor=#d6d6d6
| 121925 ||  || — || February 29, 2000 || Socorro || LINEAR || — || align=right | 6.8 km || 
|-id=926 bgcolor=#d6d6d6
| 121926 ||  || — || February 29, 2000 || Socorro || LINEAR || — || align=right | 6.8 km || 
|-id=927 bgcolor=#fefefe
| 121927 ||  || — || February 29, 2000 || Socorro || LINEAR || FLO || align=right | 1.4 km || 
|-id=928 bgcolor=#fefefe
| 121928 ||  || — || February 29, 2000 || Socorro || LINEAR || — || align=right | 1.5 km || 
|-id=929 bgcolor=#fefefe
| 121929 ||  || — || February 29, 2000 || Socorro || LINEAR || FLO || align=right data-sort-value="0.82" | 820 m || 
|-id=930 bgcolor=#fefefe
| 121930 ||  || — || February 29, 2000 || Socorro || LINEAR || — || align=right | 1.8 km || 
|-id=931 bgcolor=#fefefe
| 121931 ||  || — || February 27, 2000 || Kitt Peak || Spacewatch || — || align=right data-sort-value="0.97" | 970 m || 
|-id=932 bgcolor=#fefefe
| 121932 ||  || — || February 25, 2000 || Kitt Peak || Spacewatch || — || align=right | 1.3 km || 
|-id=933 bgcolor=#d6d6d6
| 121933 ||  || — || March 3, 2000 || Socorro || LINEAR || HYG || align=right | 6.3 km || 
|-id=934 bgcolor=#d6d6d6
| 121934 ||  || — || March 3, 2000 || Socorro || LINEAR || — || align=right | 5.8 km || 
|-id=935 bgcolor=#d6d6d6
| 121935 ||  || — || March 2, 2000 || Kitt Peak || Spacewatch || — || align=right | 4.6 km || 
|-id=936 bgcolor=#fefefe
| 121936 ||  || — || March 2, 2000 || Kitt Peak || Spacewatch || — || align=right | 1.1 km || 
|-id=937 bgcolor=#fefefe
| 121937 ||  || — || March 3, 2000 || Socorro || LINEAR || — || align=right | 1.6 km || 
|-id=938 bgcolor=#fefefe
| 121938 ||  || — || March 4, 2000 || Socorro || LINEAR || — || align=right | 2.0 km || 
|-id=939 bgcolor=#d6d6d6
| 121939 ||  || — || March 4, 2000 || Socorro || LINEAR || — || align=right | 9.8 km || 
|-id=940 bgcolor=#fefefe
| 121940 ||  || — || March 3, 2000 || Socorro || LINEAR || NYS || align=right | 1.6 km || 
|-id=941 bgcolor=#d6d6d6
| 121941 ||  || — || March 5, 2000 || Socorro || LINEAR || — || align=right | 5.6 km || 
|-id=942 bgcolor=#fefefe
| 121942 ||  || — || March 8, 2000 || Kitt Peak || Spacewatch || — || align=right | 1.7 km || 
|-id=943 bgcolor=#d6d6d6
| 121943 ||  || — || March 4, 2000 || Socorro || LINEAR || 7:4 || align=right | 6.3 km || 
|-id=944 bgcolor=#fefefe
| 121944 ||  || — || March 4, 2000 || Socorro || LINEAR || — || align=right | 1.5 km || 
|-id=945 bgcolor=#d6d6d6
| 121945 ||  || — || March 5, 2000 || Socorro || LINEAR || — || align=right | 4.1 km || 
|-id=946 bgcolor=#d6d6d6
| 121946 ||  || — || March 5, 2000 || Socorro || LINEAR || ALA || align=right | 6.9 km || 
|-id=947 bgcolor=#fefefe
| 121947 ||  || — || March 3, 2000 || Socorro || LINEAR || — || align=right | 2.4 km || 
|-id=948 bgcolor=#fefefe
| 121948 ||  || — || March 8, 2000 || Socorro || LINEAR || FLO || align=right | 1.5 km || 
|-id=949 bgcolor=#fefefe
| 121949 ||  || — || March 8, 2000 || Socorro || LINEAR || FLO || align=right | 1.4 km || 
|-id=950 bgcolor=#fefefe
| 121950 ||  || — || March 8, 2000 || Socorro || LINEAR || — || align=right | 2.0 km || 
|-id=951 bgcolor=#fefefe
| 121951 ||  || — || March 9, 2000 || Socorro || LINEAR || KLI || align=right | 2.9 km || 
|-id=952 bgcolor=#fefefe
| 121952 ||  || — || March 9, 2000 || Socorro || LINEAR || NYS || align=right | 3.4 km || 
|-id=953 bgcolor=#fefefe
| 121953 ||  || — || March 10, 2000 || Prescott || P. G. Comba || — || align=right | 1.9 km || 
|-id=954 bgcolor=#fefefe
| 121954 ||  || — || March 10, 2000 || Prescott || P. G. Comba || — || align=right | 1.4 km || 
|-id=955 bgcolor=#d6d6d6
| 121955 ||  || — || March 4, 2000 || Kitt Peak || Spacewatch || — || align=right | 6.0 km || 
|-id=956 bgcolor=#fefefe
| 121956 ||  || — || March 9, 2000 || Kitt Peak || Spacewatch || — || align=right | 1.4 km || 
|-id=957 bgcolor=#fefefe
| 121957 ||  || — || March 10, 2000 || Kitt Peak || Spacewatch || FLO || align=right | 1.6 km || 
|-id=958 bgcolor=#fefefe
| 121958 ||  || — || March 8, 2000 || Socorro || LINEAR || NYS || align=right | 1.7 km || 
|-id=959 bgcolor=#fefefe
| 121959 ||  || — || March 10, 2000 || Socorro || LINEAR || — || align=right | 2.7 km || 
|-id=960 bgcolor=#fefefe
| 121960 ||  || — || March 10, 2000 || Socorro || LINEAR || — || align=right | 1.3 km || 
|-id=961 bgcolor=#fefefe
| 121961 ||  || — || March 5, 2000 || Socorro || LINEAR || FLO || align=right | 1.6 km || 
|-id=962 bgcolor=#fefefe
| 121962 ||  || — || March 5, 2000 || Socorro || LINEAR || NYS || align=right | 1.2 km || 
|-id=963 bgcolor=#fefefe
| 121963 ||  || — || March 8, 2000 || Socorro || LINEAR || FLO || align=right | 2.0 km || 
|-id=964 bgcolor=#d6d6d6
| 121964 ||  || — || March 11, 2000 || Kitt Peak || Spacewatch || — || align=right | 5.9 km || 
|-id=965 bgcolor=#fefefe
| 121965 ||  || — || March 12, 2000 || Kitt Peak || Spacewatch || — || align=right | 1.3 km || 
|-id=966 bgcolor=#fefefe
| 121966 ||  || — || March 11, 2000 || Socorro || LINEAR || FLO || align=right | 3.9 km || 
|-id=967 bgcolor=#fefefe
| 121967 ||  || — || March 8, 2000 || Haleakala || NEAT || FLO || align=right | 1.4 km || 
|-id=968 bgcolor=#d6d6d6
| 121968 ||  || — || March 8, 2000 || Kitt Peak || Spacewatch || EOS || align=right | 4.1 km || 
|-id=969 bgcolor=#fefefe
| 121969 ||  || — || March 8, 2000 || Haleakala || NEAT || V || align=right | 1.2 km || 
|-id=970 bgcolor=#d6d6d6
| 121970 ||  || — || March 9, 2000 || Kitt Peak || Spacewatch || THM || align=right | 4.4 km || 
|-id=971 bgcolor=#fefefe
| 121971 ||  || — || March 9, 2000 || Socorro || LINEAR || FLO || align=right | 2.1 km || 
|-id=972 bgcolor=#d6d6d6
| 121972 ||  || — || March 11, 2000 || Anderson Mesa || LONEOS || — || align=right | 7.7 km || 
|-id=973 bgcolor=#fefefe
| 121973 ||  || — || March 11, 2000 || Anderson Mesa || LONEOS || — || align=right | 1.7 km || 
|-id=974 bgcolor=#d6d6d6
| 121974 ||  || — || March 11, 2000 || Anderson Mesa || LONEOS || — || align=right | 5.5 km || 
|-id=975 bgcolor=#fefefe
| 121975 ||  || — || March 11, 2000 || Anderson Mesa || LONEOS || KLI || align=right | 4.4 km || 
|-id=976 bgcolor=#fefefe
| 121976 ||  || — || March 11, 2000 || Anderson Mesa || LONEOS || NYS || align=right | 1.2 km || 
|-id=977 bgcolor=#fefefe
| 121977 ||  || — || March 11, 2000 || Anderson Mesa || LONEOS || PHO || align=right | 3.3 km || 
|-id=978 bgcolor=#fefefe
| 121978 ||  || — || March 8, 2000 || Mauna Kea || R. J. Whiteley || H || align=right | 1.1 km || 
|-id=979 bgcolor=#fefefe
| 121979 ||  || — || March 5, 2000 || Socorro || LINEAR || — || align=right | 1.3 km || 
|-id=980 bgcolor=#fefefe
| 121980 ||  || — || March 10, 2000 || Socorro || LINEAR || — || align=right | 2.2 km || 
|-id=981 bgcolor=#d6d6d6
| 121981 ||  || — || March 3, 2000 || Socorro || LINEAR || VER || align=right | 6.5 km || 
|-id=982 bgcolor=#d6d6d6
| 121982 ||  || — || March 3, 2000 || Socorro || LINEAR || THM || align=right | 4.6 km || 
|-id=983 bgcolor=#fefefe
| 121983 ||  || — || March 3, 2000 || Socorro || LINEAR || FLO || align=right | 1.2 km || 
|-id=984 bgcolor=#fefefe
| 121984 ||  || — || March 4, 2000 || Socorro || LINEAR || FLO || align=right | 1.1 km || 
|-id=985 bgcolor=#fefefe
| 121985 ||  || — || March 10, 2000 || Kitt Peak || Spacewatch || NYS || align=right | 3.1 km || 
|-id=986 bgcolor=#fefefe
| 121986 ||  || — || March 4, 2000 || Socorro || LINEAR || — || align=right | 2.0 km || 
|-id=987 bgcolor=#E9E9E9
| 121987 ||  || — || March 3, 2000 || Socorro || LINEAR || — || align=right | 2.3 km || 
|-id=988 bgcolor=#d6d6d6
| 121988 ||  || — || March 29, 2000 || Kitt Peak || Spacewatch || — || align=right | 3.8 km || 
|-id=989 bgcolor=#fefefe
| 121989 ||  || — || March 30, 2000 || Kitt Peak || Spacewatch || V || align=right | 1.3 km || 
|-id=990 bgcolor=#d6d6d6
| 121990 ||  || — || March 28, 2000 || Socorro || LINEAR || — || align=right | 11 km || 
|-id=991 bgcolor=#fefefe
| 121991 ||  || — || March 28, 2000 || Socorro || LINEAR || — || align=right | 1.5 km || 
|-id=992 bgcolor=#fefefe
| 121992 ||  || — || March 29, 2000 || Socorro || LINEAR || V || align=right | 1.6 km || 
|-id=993 bgcolor=#fefefe
| 121993 ||  || — || March 27, 2000 || Anderson Mesa || LONEOS || — || align=right | 1.2 km || 
|-id=994 bgcolor=#fefefe
| 121994 ||  || — || March 27, 2000 || Anderson Mesa || LONEOS || FLO || align=right data-sort-value="0.94" | 940 m || 
|-id=995 bgcolor=#fefefe
| 121995 ||  || — || March 29, 2000 || Socorro || LINEAR || NYS || align=right | 1.4 km || 
|-id=996 bgcolor=#fefefe
| 121996 ||  || — || March 29, 2000 || Socorro || LINEAR || — || align=right | 1.6 km || 
|-id=997 bgcolor=#fefefe
| 121997 ||  || — || March 29, 2000 || Socorro || LINEAR || — || align=right | 3.2 km || 
|-id=998 bgcolor=#fefefe
| 121998 ||  || — || March 29, 2000 || Socorro || LINEAR || — || align=right | 1.3 km || 
|-id=999 bgcolor=#fefefe
| 121999 ||  || — || March 29, 2000 || Socorro || LINEAR || — || align=right | 1.9 km || 
|-id=000 bgcolor=#fefefe
| 122000 ||  || — || March 29, 2000 || Socorro || LINEAR || — || align=right | 2.0 km || 
|}

References

External links 
 Discovery Circumstances: Numbered Minor Planets (120001)–(125000) (IAU Minor Planet Center)

0121